= Brenda Lee singles discography =

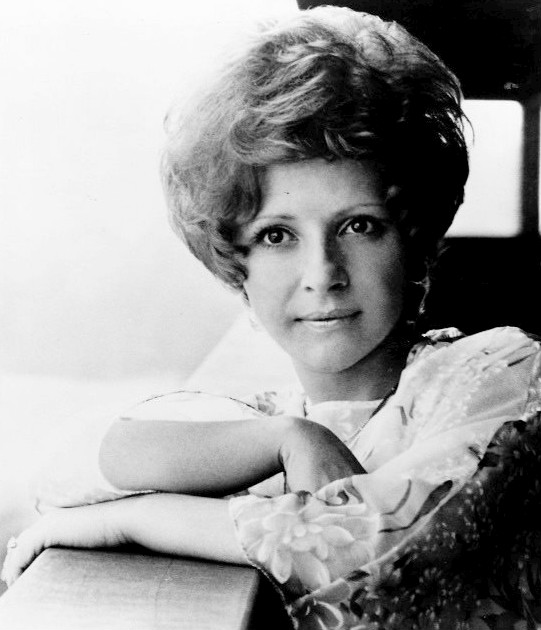
- Brenda Lee in 1977
- Music videos: 3
- Lead artist singles: 89
- Collaborative and featured singles: 4
- Foreign language singles: 9
- Promotional singles: 24
- Other charted songs: 19

The singles discography of American singer Brenda Lee contains 89 as a lead artist, four as a collaborative and featured artist, nine released in foreign languages, 24 promotional singles, 19 other charting songs and three music videos (for singles and songs). Lee's debut single was released by Decca Records in 1956 called "Jambalaya (On the Bayou)". The 1957 single "One Step at a Time" was her first to make the US charts. The 1958 release of "Rockin' Around the Christmas Tree" did not chart until Lee had further charting singles in 1960. Originally the US Hot 100 top 20, it would later top the same chart 65 years later in 2023. In recent years, it has also made chart positions in several other countries.

The 1959 single "Sweet Nothin's" was Lee's first top ten recording, reaching number four in the US and the UK. The follow-up was the 1960 US and Australian top ten "That's All You Gotta Do". Its B-side titled "I'm Sorry" reached number one on the US Hot 100, number six in Australia, number two in Belgium and number 12 in the UK. "I Want to Be Wanted" was also a chart-topping US single. Between 1961 and 1963, nine of Lee's singles made top ten positions in the US. Some of them also reached the top ten in Australia, Belgium, Canada, Ireland, Norway and the UK: "Emotions", "You Can Depend on Me", "Dum Dum", "Fool No. 1", "Break It to Me Gently", "Speak to Me Pretty", "Everybody Loves Me But You", "All Alone Am I" and "Losing You".

Following 1963, Lee's singles made the top ten with less frequency. In the US, she reached the top 20 through 1966 with singles like "The Grass Is Greener", "As Usual", "Too Many Rivers" and "Coming on Strong". Many of these releases (along with several more) made the top ten on the US adult contemporary chart. The singles "As Usual", "Is It True" and "I Wonder" made the top ten in Canada and European countries. Lee's last US top 40 entry was 1967's "Ride, Ride, Ride". In 1968, she collaborated with Pete Fountain on the single "Cabaret".

During the 1970s, Lee found commercial success in the country market. The 1973 single "Nobody Wins" reached the number five position on the US Hot Country Songs chart and went to number one on the Canadian RPM Country Tracks chart. Between 1973 and 1975, all of five of Lee's singles made the top ten on the US country chart: "Sunday Sunrise", "Wrong Ideas", "Big Four Poster Bed", "Rock on Baby" and "He's My Rock". While several more releases made the country charts, they stalled in the top 40. In 1979, "Tell Me What It's Like" returned Lee to the US country top ten. It was followed in 1980 by the top ten US and Canadian country song "The Cowgirl and the Dandy". In 1981, "Broken Trust" reached the number nine position on the US country chart. Lee's singles continued to make the US country chart through 1985 and in Canada through 1991.

== As lead artist ==
=== 1950s ===
List of singles, with selected chart positions, showing other relevant details
Title	Year	Peak chart positions										Certifications	Album
Title	Year	US	US AC	US Cou.	US R&B	AUS	CAN	GER	IRE	NOR	UK	Certifications	Album
"Jambalaya (On the Bayou)"	1956	—	—	—	—	—	—	—	—	—	—		—N/a
"I'm Gonna Lasso Santa Claus"	1956	—	—	—	—	—	—	—	—	—	—		—N/a
"One Step at a Time"	1957	43	—	15	—	—	—	—	—	—	—		—N/a
"Dynamite"	1957	72	—	—	—	—	—	—	—	—	—		—N/a
"One Teenager to Another"	1957	—	—	—	—	—	—	—	—	—	—		—N/a
"Rock-a-Bye Baby Blues"	1957	—	—	—	—	—	—	—	—	—	—		—N/a
"Ring-a My Phone"	1958	—	—	—	—	—	—	—	—	—	—		—N/a
"Rockin' Around the Christmas Tree" (Note: "Rockin' Around the Christmas Tree" did not chart upon its initial 1958 release. In 1960, it first peaked at the number 14 position on the Billboard Hot 100 singles chart. The song continued making appearances on the Hot 100 and other record charts since then. Its most recent peak positions are located here.)	1958	1	16	62	—	2	4	3	2	9	3	RIAA: 7× Platinum; BPI: 5× Platinum; BVMI: 3× Gold; MC: 8× Platinum	Merry Christmas from Brenda Lee
"Bill Bailey, Won't You Please Come Home"	1958	—	—	—	—	—	—	—	—	—	—		—N/a
"Let's Jump the Broomstick"	1959	—	—	—	—	—	—	—	—	—	12		Brenda Lee
"Sweet Nothin's"	1959	4	—	—	12	25	—	—	34	—	4		Brenda Lee
"—" denotes a recording that did not chart or was not released in that territory.

=== 1960s ===
List of singles, with selected chart positions, showing other relevant details
Title	Year	Peak chart positions										Album
Title	Year	US	US AC	US R&B	AUS	BEL	CAN	GER	IRE	NOR	UK	Album
"Weep No More My Baby"	1960	—	—	—	—	—	—	—	—	—	—	Brenda Lee
"That's All You Gotta Do"	1960	6	—	19	6	—	—	—	—	—	—	Brenda Lee
"I Want to Be Wanted"	1960	1	—	7	10	17	—	—	—	—	31	This Is...Brenda
"Emotions"	1960	7	—	—	20	6	—	47	—	—	45	Emotions
"You Can Depend on Me"	1961	6	—	25	49	—	—	—	—	—	—	Brenda, That's All
"Pretend"	1961	—	—	—	—	—	—	—	—	—	—	This Is...Brenda
"Dum Dum"	1961	4	—	—	4	10	—	—	—	—	22	All the Way
"Fool No. 1"	1961	3	—	—	23	—	—	—	—	—	38	Brenda, That's All
"Break It to Me Gently"	1962	4	—	—	10	—	3	—	—	—	46	..."Let Me Sing"
"Speak to Me Pretty"	1962	—	—	—	—	—	—	—	—	8	3	All the Way
"Everybody Loves Me But You"	1962	6	2	—	40	—	—	—	—	—	—	—N/a
"Heart in Hand"	1962	15	4	—	37	—	—	—	—	—	—	—N/a
"All Alone Am I"	1962	3	1	—	10	6	—	—	5	—	7	All Alone Am I
"Your Used to Be"	1963	32	12	—	19	14	—	—	—	—	—	—N/a
"Losing You"	1963	6	2	13	15	18	20	—	—	—	10	..."Let Me Sing"
"It's a Lonesome Old Town"	1963	—	—	—	—	—	—	—	—	—	—	Brenda, That's All
"If You Love Me (Really Love Me)"	1963	—	—	—	—	—	—	—	—	—	—	—N/a
"I Wonder"	1963	25	9	—	—	—	—	—	10	—	14	By Request
"The Grass Is Greener"	1963	17	7	—	73	—	—	—	—	—	—	By Request
"As Usual"	1963	12	5	—	12	18	—	—	4	9	5	By Request
"Think"	1964	25	4	—	62	—	—	—	—	—	26	Too Many Rivers
"Alone with You"	1964	48	8	—	—	—	32	—	—	—	—	—N/a
"When You Loved Me"	1964	47	9	—	—	—	—	—	—	—	—	Brenda Lee Sings Top Teen Hits
"Is It True"	1964	17	—	—	58	—	8	—	—	—	17	Brenda Lee Sings Top Teen Hits
"Jingle Bell Rock"	1964	—	—	—	—	—	—	—	—	—	—	Merry Christmas from Brenda Lee
"This Time of the Year"	1964	—	—	—	—	—	—	—	—	—	—	Merry Christmas from Brenda Lee
"Christmas Will Be Just Another Lonely Day"	1964	—	—	—	—	—	—	—	—	—	25	Merry Christmas from Brenda Lee
"Thanks a Lot"	1965	45	—	—	100	—	14	—	—	—	41	Brenda Lee Sings Top Teen Hits
"Truly, Truly True"	1965	54	9	—	—	—	—	—	—	—	—	The Versatile Brenda Lee
"Too Many Rivers"	1965	13	2	—	99	—	—	—	—	—	22	Too Many Rivers
"Rusty Bells"	1965	33	3	—	—	—	—	—	—	—	—	Bye Bye Blues
"Too Little Time"	1966	— (Note: "Too Little Time" peaked at number 23 on the Billboard Bubbling Under Hot 100 singles chart, a list which acts as a 25-song extension of the Hot 100.)	—	—	—	—	—	—	—	—	—	—N/a
"Ain't Gonna Cry No More"	1966	77	—	—	—	—	90	—	—	—	—	—N/a
"Coming on Strong"	1966	11	—	—	76	—	9	—	—	—	—	Coming on Strong
"Ride, Ride, Ride"	1967	37	—	—	—	—	39	—	—	—	—	—N/a
"Take Me"	1967	91	—	—	—	—	97	—	—	—	—	—N/a
"Where Love Is"	1967	— (Note: "Where Love Is" peaked at number 34 on the Billboard Bubbling Under Hot 100 singles chart, a list which acts as a 25-song extension of the Hot 100.)	—	—	—	—	—	—	—	—	—	—N/a
"Where's the Melody?"	1967	— (Note: "Where's the Melody" peaked at number 5 on the Billboard Bubbling Under Hot 100 singles chart, a list which acts as a 25-song extension of the Hot 100.)	—	—	—	—	—	—	—	—	—	—N/a
"That's All Right"	1968	— (Note: "That's All Right" peaked at number 18 on the Billboard Bubbling Under Hot 100 singles chart, a list which acts as a 25-song extension of the Hot 100.)	—	—	—	—	—	—	—	—	—	—N/a
"Kansas City"	1968	—	—	—	—	—	—	39	—	—	—	All the Way
"Johnny One Time"	1968	41	3	—	—	—	38	—	—	—	—	Johnny One Time
"You Don't Need Me Anymore"	1969	84	32	—	—	—	62	—	—	—	—	—N/a
"—" denotes a recording that did not chart or was not released in that territory.

=== 1970s ===
List of singles, with selected chart positions, showing other relevant details
Title	Year	Peak chart positions				Album
Title	Year	US	US AC	US Cou.	CAN Cou.	Album
"I Think I Love You Again"	1970	97	37	—	—	Memphis Portrait
"Sisters in Sorrow"	1970	—	—	—	—	Memphis Portrait
"Proud Mary"	1971	—	—	—	—	Memphis Portrait
"If This Is Our Last Time"	1971	—	—	30	28	—N/a
"Misty Memories"	1971	—	—	37	10	—N/a
"Always on My Mind"	1972	—	—	45	40	Brenda
"Nobody Wins"	1973	70	—	5	1	Brenda
"Sunday Sunrise"	1973	—	—	6	8	New Sunrise
"Wrong Ideas"	1973	—	—	6	5	New Sunrise
"Big Four Poster Bed"	1974	—	—	4	2	Brenda Lee Now
"Rock on Baby"	1974	—	—	6	17	Brenda Lee Now
"He's My Rock"	1975	—	—	8	10	Sincerely, Brenda Lee
"Bringing It Back"	1975	—	—	23	26	—N/a
"Find Yourself Another Puppet"	1976	—	—	38	23	—N/a
"Brother Shelton"	1976	—	—	77	—	—N/a
"Takin' What I Can Get"	1976	—	—	41	—	L. A. Sessions
"Ruby's Lounge"	1977	—	—	78	—	L. A. Sessions
"Left-Over Love"	1978	—	—	62	—	—N/a
"Tell Me What It's Like"	1979	—	—	8	18	Even Better
"—" denotes a recording that did not chart or was not released in that territory.

=== 1980s–1990s ===
List of singles, with selected chart positions, showing other relevant details
Title	Year	Peak chart positions		Album
Title	Year	US Cou.	CAN Cou.	Album
"The Cowgirl and the Dandy"	1980	10	8	Even Better
"Don't Promise Me Anything"	1980	49	—	—N/a
"Broken Trust" (with The Oak Ridge Boys)	1980	9	14	Take Me Back
"Every Now and Then"	1981	26	43	Take Me Back
"Fool, Fool"	1981	67	—	—N/a
"Enough for You"	1981	75	—	—N/a
"Only When I Laugh"	1981	32	—	Only When I Laugh
"From Levis to Calvin Klein Jeans"	1982	33	33	Only When I Laugh
"Keeping Me Warm for You"	1982	70	—	Even Better
"Just for the Moment"	1982	78	—	—N/a
"Didn't We Do It Good"	1983	75	—	—N/a
"A Sweeter Love (I'll Never Know)"	1984	22	—	—N/a
"I'm Takin' My Time"	1985	54	—	Feels So Right
"Why You Been Gone So Long"	1985	50	—	Feels So Right
"Two Hearts"	1986	—	—	Feels So Right
"Your One and Only"	1991	—	85	Brenda Lee
"A Little Unfair"	1991	—	—	Brenda Lee
"—" denotes a recording that did not chart or was not released in that territory.

== As a collaborative and featured artist ==
List of singles, with selected chart positions, showing other relevant details
Title	Year	Peak chart positions		Album
Title	Year	US Cou.	CAN Cou.	Album
"Cabaret" (with Pete Fountain)	1968	—	—	For the First Time
"You're Gonna Love Yourself (In the Morning)" (with Willie Nelson)	1983	43	—	The Winning Hand
"Hallelujah I Love You So" (George Jones with Brenda Lee)	1984	15	13	Ladies' Choice
"America the Beautiful" (credited with various artists)	2001	58	—	—N/a
"—" denotes a recording that did not chart or was not released in that territory.

== Foreign language singles ==
List of singles, with selected chart positions, showing other relevant details
Title	Year	Peak chart positions		Album
Title	Year	GER	JPN	Album
"Nunca Es Demasiado Tarde"	1961	—	—	—N/a
"Darling Bye Bye"	1962	—	—	—N/a
"Geh'am Gluck Nicht Vorbel"	1963	—	—	—N/a
"In Meinen Träumen"	1963	—	—	—N/a
"Wiedersehn ist Wunderschön"	1964	23	—	—N/a
"Drei Rote Rosen Blühn"	1964	—	—	—N/a
"Ich Will Immer Auf Dich Warten"	1964	15	—	—N/a
"One Rainy Night in Tokyo"	1965	—	7 (Note: "One Rainy Night in Tokyo" was released prior to the introduction of the Japanese Oricon record chart in 1968. Prior to that, a series of magazines were published called Music Life which featured a record chart. The June 1965 edition placed "One Rainy Night in Tokyo" at the number seven position in June 1965.)	One Rainy Night in Tokyo
"La Vie en Rose"	1968	—	—	—N/a
"—" denotes a recording that did not chart or was not released in that territory.

== Promotional singles ==
List of singles, showing all relevant details
Title	Year	Album	Ref.
"Teach Me Tonight"	1961	This Is...Brenda	
"Georgia on My Mind"	1961	Emotions	
"If You Love Me (Really Love Me)"	1961	Emotions	
"Swanee River Rock"	1961	Emotions	
"You Always Hurt the One You Love"	1961	Sincerely	
"You Got Me Crying Again"	1962	Sincerely	
"Send Me Some Lovin'"	1962	Sincerely	
"Fools Rush In (Where Angels Fear to Tread)"	1962	Sincerely	
"Hold Me"	1962	Sincerely	
"A Marshmallow World"	1964	Merry Christmas from Brenda Lee	
"Lucky"	1975	Sincerely, Brenda Lee	
"Before the Next Teardrop Falls"	1976	Sincerely, Brenda Lee	
"It's Another Weekend"	1976	L.A. Sessions	
"Mind Games"	1981	—N/a	
"Lay Away Your Heart"	1982	—N/a	
"Losing You" (Live)	2010	—N/a	
"I'm Learning About Love" (Live)	2010	—N/a	
"Fool #1" (Live)	2021	—N/a	
"Just Because" (Live)	2021	—N/a	
"Jambalaya (On the Bayou)" (Live)	2021	—N/a	
"Time and Time Again" (Live)	2021	—N/a	
"You're in the Doghouse Now"	2021	—N/a	
"Rockin' Around the Christmas Tree" (re-imagined)	2022	—N/a	
"Noche Buena y Navidad"	2024	—N/a	

== Other charted songs ==
List of songs, with selected chart positions, showing other relevant details
Title	Year	Peak chart positions								Album	Notes
Title	Year	US	US AC	US R&B	AUS	BEL	CAN	GER	UK	Album	Notes
"I'm Sorry"	1960	1	—	19	6	2	—	25	12	Brenda Lee	(Note: B-side to "That's All You Gotta Do".)
"Just a Little"	1960	40	—	—	—	—	—	—	—	This Is Brenda	(Note: B-side to "I Want to Be Wanted".)
"I'm Learning About Love"	1960	33	—	—	20	—	—	—	—	Emotions	(Note: B-side to "Emotions".)
"It's Never Too Late"	1961	— (Note: "It's Never Too Late" peaked at number 1 on the Billboard Bubbling Under Hot 100 singles chart, a list which acts as a 25-song extension of the Hot 100.)	—	—	100	—	—	—	—	—N/a	(Note: B-side to "You Can Depend on Me".)
"Eventually"	1961	56	—	—	—	—	—	—	—	All the Way	(Note: B-side to "Dum Dum".)
"Anybody But Me"	1961	31	—	—	23	—	—	—	—	—N/a	(Note: B-side to "Fool No. 1".)
"So Deep"	1962	52	—	—	10	—	—	—	—	—N/a	(Note: B-side to "Break It to Me Gently".)
"Here Comes That Feeling"	1962	89	—	—	40	—	—	—	5	—N/a	(Note: B-side to "Everybody Loves Me But You".)
"It Started All Over Again"	1962	29	—	—	37	—	—	—	15	—N/a	(Note: B-side to "Heart in Hand".)
"Save All Your Lovin' for Me"	1962	53	—	—	—	—	—	—	—	—N/a	(Note: B-side to "All Alone Am I".)
"She'll Never Know"	1963	47	15	—	—	—	—	—	—	—N/a	(Note: B-side to "Your Used to Be".)
"He's So Heavenly"	1963	73	—	—	—	—	—	—	—	—N/a	(Note: B-side to "Losing You".)
"My Whole World Is Falling Down"	1963	24	8	—	16	—	—	—	—	By Request	(Note: B-side to "I Wonder".)
"Sweet Impossible You"	1963	70	—	—	94	—	—	—	28	—N/a	(Note: B-side to "The Grass Is Greener".)
"Lonely, Lonely, Lonely Me"	1963	—	—	—	12	—	—	—	—	—N/a	(Note: B-side to "As Usual".)
"The Waiting Game"	1964	— (Note: "The Waiting Game" peaked at number 1 on the Billboard Bubbling Under Hot 100 singles chart, a list which acts as a 25-song extension of the Hot 100.)	—	—	62	—	—	—	—	—N/a	(Note: B-side to "Think".)
"He's Sure to Remember Me"	1964	— (Note: "He's Sure to Remember Me" peaked at number 34 on the Billboard Bubbling Under Hot 100 singles chart, a list which acts as a 25-song extension of the Hot 100.)	—	—	—	—	—	—	—	—N/a	(Note: B-side to "When You Loved Me".)
"My Dreams"	1964	85	—	—	—	—	—	—	—	—N/a	(Note: B-side to "Alone with You".)
"Crying Game"	1965	87	—	—	—	—	—	—	—	Brenda Lee Sings Top Teen Hits	(Note: B-side to "Thanks a Lot".)
"No One"	1965	98	25	—	—	—	25	—	—	Too Many Rivers	(Note: B-side to "Too Many Rivers".)
"Time and Time Again"	1966	— (Note: "Time and Time Again" peaked at number 26 on the Billboard Bubbling Under Hot 100 singles chart, a list which acts as a 25-song extension of the Hot 100.)	—	—	—	—	—	—	—	—N/a	(Note: B-side to "Too Little Time".)
"—" denotes a recording that did not chart or was not released in that territory.

=== Holiday 100 chart entries ===
Since many radio stations in the US adopt a format change to Christmas music each December, many holiday hits have an annual spike in popularity during the last few weeks of the year and are retired once the season is over. In December 2011, Billboard began a Holiday Songs chart with 50 positions that monitors the last five weeks of each year to "rank the top holiday hits of all eras using the same methodology as the Hot 100, blending streaming, airplay, and sales data", and in 2013 the number of positions on the chart was doubled, resulting in the Holiday 100. Lee's recording of "Rockin' Around the Christmas Tree" has made appearances on the Holiday 100, which are noted below according to the holiday season in which it charted there.

Title	Holiday season peak chart positions															Album
Title	2011	2012	2013	2014	2015	2016	2017	2018	2019	2020	2021	2022	2023	2024	2025	Album
"Jingle Bell Rock"	—	—	—	—	—	—	—	—	89	68	90	76	83	96	81	Merry Christmas from Brenda Lee
"Rockin' Around the Christmas Tree"	3	2	2	3	2	2	2	3	2	2	2	2	1	2	2	Merry Christmas from Brenda Lee

== Music videos for singles and songs ==
List of music videos, showing year released and director
Title	Year	Director(s)	Ref.
"Didn't We Do It Good"	1984	not available	
"Honky Tonk Angels Medley" (k. d. lang with Brenda Lee, Loretta Lynn and Kitty Wells)	1988	David Hogan	
"Rockin' Around the Christmas Tree" (Brenda Lee featuring Tanya Tucker and Trisha Yearwood)	2023	Running Bear	
