= Brenda Lee albums discography =

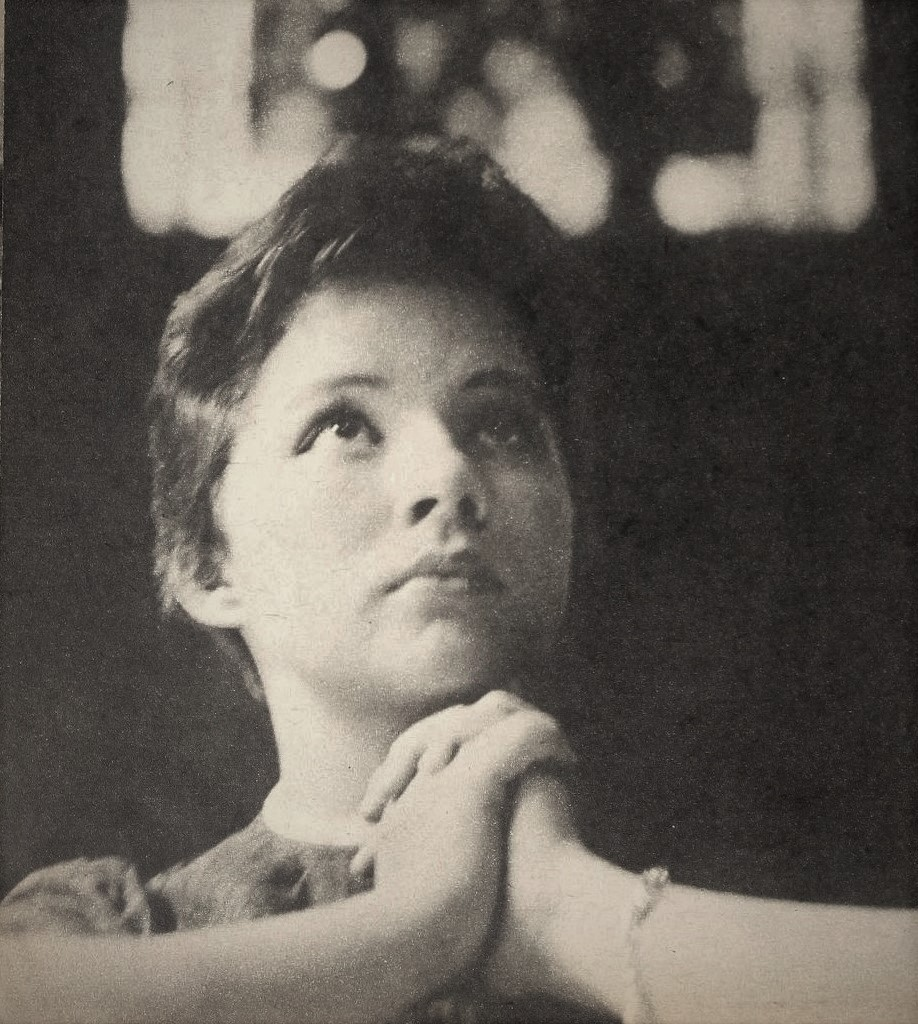
- Brenda Lee in 1960
- Studio albums: 36
- Extended plays: 69
- Live albums: 2
- Compilation albums: 64
- Video albums: 2
- Box sets: 2
- Other album appearances: 16

The albums discography of American singer Brenda Lee contains 36 studio albums, two live albums, 64 compilation albums, two video albums, two box sets, 69 extended plays (EP's) and 16 additional album appearances. In August 1959, Decca Records released Lee's debut studio album titled Grandma, What Great Songs You Sang!. Her second studio album Brenda Lee (1960) was the first to make the US Billboard 200 chart, climbing to number five. In October 1960, This Is...Brenda reached number four in the US and was her highest-charting album there. Lee's fifth album All the Way (1961) was her first to make the UK albums chart, rising to number 20. All Alone Am I (1963) was Lee's highest-charting UK album, rising to number eight in 1962. The Decca and Brunswick labels also issued a series of EP's by Lee during the 1950s and 1960s. Although none of them made charting positions both labels issued 66 EP's by 1967.

The Decca label continued released between two and three studio albums of Lee's material each year. In 1964, By Request reached number 90 in the US and Merry Christmas from Brenda Lee reached number seven in the US. Four studio discs of Lee's work was issued in 1965. Only the third 1965 release Too Many Rivers made the US Billboard 200, peaking at number 36. One Rainy Night in Tokyo was recorded entirely in Japanese. In 1966, both Bye Bye Blues and Coming on Strong made the US chart. The 1967 album For the First Time was a collaborative piece with Pete Fountain. Starting in the 1970s, Lee's music was released on MCA Records. It was also marketed towards the country genre and started making the US Top Country Albums chart. This began with 1973's Brenda, which peaked at number seven. It was followed by New Sunrise (1973), Sincerely, Brenda Lee (1975) and L. A. Sessions (1976), which also made the country albums chart. Additionally, the compilation The Brenda Lee Story (1973), reached number six on the country chart.

The MCA label released four more studio albums through 1985. Only Take Me Back (1980) made the US country albums chart. However, a collaborative studio disc with Kris Kristofferson, Willie Nelson and Dolly Parton reached the US country top ten called The Winning Hand. Lee's compilation albums also started charting during the 1980s. This included Little Miss Dynamite (1980), which reached number 43 in Australia and number 15 in the UK. The British Phonographic Industry (BPI) certified the disc silver as well. A collaborative compilation with Connie Francis called Nothin' But the Best made the Australian top 40 in 1982. In 1985, The Very Best of Brenda Lee reached the top 20 in the UK and certified gold in sales from the BPI. Foreign language compilations were also issued during the decade, including the German Wiedersehn Ist Wunderschön (1985).

In 1991, Warner Bros. Records released two new studio albums by Lee: Brenda Lee and A Brenda Lee Christmas. Her eponymous disc made the top 70 of the US country chart. Lee re-recorded her former material for an album in 1996 released on her own label titled Brenda Lee Productions. Since then, she has released two albums of gospel music on the label: Precious Memories (1997) and Gospel Duets with Treasured Friends (2007). Several labels (notably MCA Records) have continued issuing compilations of Lee's former material. During the 1990s, Rockin' Around the Christmas Tree made the US Billboard 200 and Top Country Albums charts. In addition, The Best Of certified gold in sales from the BPI in 1995. In 2023, Universal Music Group released Lee's first EP in several decades called A Rockin' Christmas with Brenda Lee.

== Studio albums ==
=== 1950s–1960s ===
List of studio albums, with selected chart positions, and other relevant details
Title	Album details	Peak chart positions		
Title	Album details	US	NL	UK
Grandma, What Great Songs You Sang!	Released: August 3, 1959; Label: Decca; Formats: LP	—	—	—
Brenda Lee	Released: July 1960; Label: Decca; Formats: LP	5	—	—
This Is...Brenda	Released: October 10, 1960; Label: Decca; Formats: LP	4	—	—
Emotions	Released: April 3, 1961; Label: Decca; Formats: LP	24	—	—
All the Way	Released: August 7, 1961; Label: Decca; Formats: LP	17	—	20
Sincerely	Released: February 12, 1962; Label: Decca; Formats: LP	29	—	—
Brenda, That's All	Released: October 15, 1962; Label: Decca; Formats: LP	20	—	13
All Alone Am I	Released: February 18, 1963; Label: Decca; Formats: LP	25	—	8
..."Let Me Sing"	Released: September 12, 1963; Label: Decca; Formats: LP	39	—	—
By Request	Released: May 18, 1964; Label: Decca; Formats: LP	90	—	—
Merry Christmas from Brenda Lee	Released: October 19, 1964; Label: Decca; Formats: LP	7	10	—
Brenda Lee Sings Top Teen Hits	Released: February 15, 1965; Label: Decca; Formats: LP	—	—	—
The Versatile Brenda Lee	Released: May 17, 1965; Label: Decca; Formats: LP	—	—	—
Too Many Rivers	Released: September 2, 1965; Label: Decca; Formats: LP	36	—	—
One Rainy Night in Tokyo	Released: 1965; Label: Decca; Formats: LP	—	—	—
Bye Bye Blues	Released: March 14, 1966; Label: Decca; Formats: LP	94	—	21
Coming on Strong	Released: November 28, 1966; Label: Decca; Formats: LP	94	—	—
Reflections in Blue	Released: October 16, 1967; Label: Decca; Formats: LP	—	—	—
For the First Time (with Pete Fountain)	Released: March 15, 1968; Label: Decca; Formats: LP	187	—	—
Johnny One Time	Released: May 19, 1969; Label: Decca; Formats: LP	98	—	—
"—" denotes a recording that did not chart or was not released in that territory.

=== 1970s ===
List of studio albums, with selected chart positions, and other relevant details
Title	Album details	Peak chart positions	
Title	Album details	US	US Cou.
Memphis Portrait	Released: September 1970; Label: Decca; Formats: LP, 8-track	—	—
Brenda	Released: March 1973; Label: MCA; Formats: LP, 8-track	206	7
New Sunrise	Released: November 1973; Label: MCA; Formats: LP, 8-track	—	3
Brenda Lee Now	Released: November 1974; Label: MCA; Formats: LP, 8-track	—	—
Sincerely, Brenda Lee	Released: April 1975; Label: MCA; Formats: LP, 8-track	—	23
L. A. Sessions	Released: December 1976; Label: MCA; Formats: LP, 8-track	—	41
Just for You Something Nice	Released: 1977; Label: MCA; Formats: LP	—	—
"—" denotes a recording that did not chart or was not released in that territory.

=== 1980s ===
List of studio albums, with selected chart positions, and other relevant details
Title	Album details	Peak chart positions
Title	Album details	US Country
Even Better	Released: January 1980; Label: MCA; Formats: LP, cassette	—
Take Me Back	Released: October 1980; Label: MCA; Formats: LP	30
Only When I Laugh	Released: November 1981; Label: MCA; Formats: LP, cassette	—
Feels So Right	Released: August 1985; Label: MCA; Formats: LP, cassette	—
"—" denotes a recording that did not chart or was not released in that territory.

=== 1990s–2000s ===
List of studio albums, with selected chart positions, and other relevant details
Title	Album details	Peak chart positions
Title	Album details	US Country
Brenda Lee	Released: April 1991; Label: Warner Bros.; Formats: CD, cassette	67
A Brenda Lee Christmas: In the New Old Fashioned Way	Released: September 1991; Label: Warner Bros.; Formats: CD, cassette	—
21 All-Time Greatest Hits (re-recordings)	Released: November 1996; Label: Brenda Lee Productions; Formats: CD	—
Precious Memories: Favorite Gospel Songs	Released: May 1997; Label: Brenda Lee Productions; Formats: CD	—
Gospel Duets with Treasured Friends	Released: April 10, 2007; Label: Provident; Formats: CD	—
"—" denotes a recording that did not chart or was not released in that territory.

== Compilation albums ==
=== 1960s ===
List of compilation albums, with selected chart positions, and other relevant details
Title	Album details	Peak chart positions
Title	Album details	US
Brenda Lee Sings Songs Everybody Knows	Released: 1961; Label: Decca; Formats: LP	—
My Greatest Songs	Released: 1963; Label: Brunswick; Formats: LP	—
Favorite Songs	Released: 1963; Label: Decca; Formats: LP	—
All Alone Am I	Released: 1964; Label: Decca; Formats: LP	—
10 Golden Years	Released: May 23, 1966; Label: Decca; Formats: LP	70
Musical Autobiography	Released: 1966; Label: Decca; Formats: LP	—
A Whole Lotta Brenda Lee	Released: 1967; Label: Decca; Formats: LP	—
Let It Be Me	Released: 1968; Label: Vocalion; Formats: LP	—
The Best of Brenda Lee	Released: 1968; Label: Brunswick; Formats: LP	—
The Versatile Brenda Lee	Released: 1969; Label: Decca; Formats: LP	—
"—" denotes a recording that did not chart or was not released in that territory.

=== 1970s ===
List of compilation albums, with selected chart positions, and other relevant details
Title	Album details	Peak chart positions
Title	Album details	US Country
The Brenda Lee Story: Her Greatest Hits	Released: July 1973; Label: MCA; Formats: LP	6
Brenda Lee	Released: 1973; Label: MCA; Formats: LP	—
The Best of Brenda Lee	Released: 1974; Label: MCA; Formats: LP	—
Brenda Lee Super Deluxe	Released: 1974; Label: MCA; Formats: LP	—
Golden Record/Golden Cassette	Released: 1975; Label: MCA; Formats: LP, cassette	—
Excellent 20	Released: 1975; Label: MCA; Formats: LP	—
Saltemos El Palo De La Escoba	Released: 1975; Label: MCA; Formats: LP	—
The Best of Brenda Lee	Released: 1976; Label: MCA; Formats: LP	—
Golden Disc	Released: 1976; Label: MCA; Formats: LP	—
Little Miss Dynamite	Released: 1976; Label: MCA; Formats: LP	—
Super Hits	Released: 1977; Label: MCA; Formats: LP	—
Miss Dynamite	Released: 1977; Label: MCA; Formats: LP	—
Dynamite	Released: 1978; Label: MCA; Formats: LP, cassette	—
Brenda Lee	Released: 1978; Label: MCA; Formats: LP	—
The Best of Brenda Lee	Released: 1979; Label: MCA; Formats: LP	—
Sound Elegance	Released: 1979; Label: MCA; Formats: LP	—
"—" denotes a recording that did not chart or was not released in that territory.

=== 1980s ===
List of compilation albums, with selected chart positions, and other relevant details
Title	Album details	Peak chart positions				Certifications
Title	Album details	US	US Cou.	AUS	UK	Certifications
Little Miss Dynamite	Released: 1980; Label: Hammard; Formats: LP, cassette	—	—	43	15	BPI: Silver
25th Anniversary	Released: 1981; Label: Ariola; Formats: LP, cassette	—	—	—	65	
Greatest Country Hits	Released: 1982; Label: MCA; Formats: LP, cassette	—	—	—	—	
16 Classic Tracks	Released: 1982; Label: MCA; Formats: LP, cassette	—	—	—	—	
I'm Sorry...But I Am Rockin'	Released: 1982; Label: MCA; Formats: LP	—	—	—	—	
Nothin' But the Very Best (with Connie Francis)	Released: 1982; Label: Hammard; Formats: LP, cassette	—	—	38	—	
The Winning Hand (with Kris Kristofferson, Willie Nelson and Dolly Parton)	Released: November 1, 1982; Label: Monument; Formats: LP, cassette	109	4	—	—	
Super Deluxe	Released: 1983; Label: MCA; Formats: LP	—	—	—	—	
Love Songs	Released: 1984; Label: MCA; Formats: LP	—	—	—	—	
The Early Years	Released: 1984; Label: MCA; Formats: LP	—	—	—	—	
Deluxe	Released: 1984; Label: MCA; Formats: LP	—	—	—	—	
The Very Best of Brenda Lee	Released: 1985; Label: MCA; Formats: LP, cassette	—	—	—	16	BPI: Gold
Wiedersehn Ist Wunderschön	Released: 1985; Label: Bear Family; Formats: LP	—	—	—	—	
Los Grandes Exitos De Brenda Lee	Released: 1985; Label: MCA; Formats: Cassette	—	—	—	—	
Best 22 Songs	Released: 1986; Label: MCA; Formats: CD	—	—	—	—	
Best 23 Songs, Vol. 2	Released: 1987; Label: MCA; Formats: CD	—	—	—	—	
"—" denotes a recording that did not chart or was not released in that territory.

=== 1990s ===
List of compilation albums, with selected chart positions, and other relevant details
Title	Album details	Peak chart positions			Certifications
Title	Album details	US	US Cou.	UK	Certifications
Anthology: 1956–1980	Released: 1991; Label: MCA; Formats: CD	—	—	—	
Anthology Volume One: 1956–1961	Released: 1991; Label: MCA; Formats: CD, cassette	—	—	—	
Anthology Volume Two: 1962–1980	Released: 1991; Label: MCA; Formats: CD, cassette	—	—	—	
The International Brenda Lee	Released: 1992; Label: Bear Family; Formats: CD, music download	—	—	—	
The ★ Collection	Released: 1992; Label: MCA; Formats: CD	—	—	—	
Best Collection	Released: 1992; Label: MCA; Formats: CD	—	—	—	
The Beautiful Music Company Presents Brenda Lee	Released: 1993; Label: Beautiful/MCA; Formats: LP, cassette	—	—	—	
Cronologia	Released: 1994; Label: MCA; Formats: CD	—	—	—	
The Crying Game	Released: 1994; Label: MCA; Formats: CD	—	—	—	
Best of Best	Released: 1994; Label: MCA; Formats: CD	—	—	—	
The Very Best of Brenda Lee...with Love	Released: October 20, 1994; Label: Telstar; Formats: CD, cassette	—	—	20	
The Best Of	Released: 1995; Label: MCA; Formats: CD	—	—	—	BPI: Gold
20th Century Masters: The Millennium Collection	Released: August 10, 1999; Label: MCA; Formats: CD, cassette	—	—	—	
Rockin' Around the Christmas Tree: The Decca Christmas Recordings	Released: October 5, 1999; Label: Decca/MCA; Formats: CD, cassette	12	1	—	
"—" denotes a recording that did not chart or was not released in that territory.

=== 2000s–2020s ===
List of compilation albums, showing all relevant details
Title	Album details
Universal Masters Collection	Released: May 29, 2000; Label: Universal; Formats: CD
20th Century Masters: The Christmas Collection	Released: September 23, 2003; Label: MCA Nashville; Formats: CD
The Collection	Released: October 5, 2004; Label: Madacy; Formats: CD
The Definitive Collection	Released: January 10, 2006; Label: MCA Nashville; Formats: CD
Rock 'N' Roll Legends	Released: February 18, 2008; Label: MCA; Formats: CD
Brenda Lee Rocks	Released: 2011; Label: Bear Family; Formats: CD
Country	Released: May 27, 2014; Label: BMG/Sony; Formats: CD
Christmas with Brenda Lee	Released: October 9, 2020; Label: BMG/Sony; Formats: Digital

== Live albums ==
List of live albums, showing all relevant details
Title	Album details
Brenda Lee in Tokyo	Released: 1965; Label: Decca; Formats: LP
Live in Japan	Released: 1975; Label: MCA; Formats: LP

== Video albums ==
List of video albums, showing all relevant details
Title	Album details
Live in Concert	Released: 2002; Label: Music Legends; Formats: DVD
I'm Sorry	Released: 2006; Label: MusicPro; Formats: DVD

== Box sets ==
List of box sets, showing all relevant details
Title	Album details
Little Miss Dynamite	Released: 1995; Label: Bear Family; Formats: CD
36 All-Time Greatest Hits	Released: 1995; Label: GSC/MCA; Formats: CD

== Extended plays ==
=== 1950s ===
List of extended plays (EP's), showing all relevant details
Title	EP details
Brenda Lee	Released: 1958; Label: Brunswick; Formats: EP
Rock the Bop	Released: 1958; Label: Brunswick; Formats: EP
Vol. 2 – Une Explosion!	Released: 1959; Label: Brunswick; Formats: EP
Some of These Days, Vol. 3	Released: 1959; Label: Brunswick; Formats: EP
Toot Toot Tootsie Goodbye Vol. 4	Released: 1959; Label: Brunswick; Formats: EP
Sweet Nothin's Vol. 5	Released: 1959; Label: Brunswick; Formats: EP
Let's Jump with Brenda Lee	Released: 1959; Label: Brunswick; Formats: EP
Sweet Nothin's	Released: 1959; Label: Decca; Formats: EP
Pretty Baby	Released: 1959; Label: Decca; Formats: EP
More Brenda Lee	Released: 1959; Label: Brunswick/Decca; Formats: EP

=== 1960s ===
List of extended plays (EP's), showing all relevant details
Title	EP details
Datesetters U.S.A. (with Carl Dobkins Jr.)	Released: 1960; Label: Decca; Formats: EP
I'm Sorry	Released: 1960; Label: Brunswick; Formats: EP
Brenda Lee	Released: 1960; Label: Decca; Formats: EP
Brenda Lee	Released: 1960; Label: Decca; Formats: EP
Sweet Brenda	Released: 1960; Label: Brunswick; Formats: EP
Emotions	Released: 1960; Label: Decca; Formats: EP
Brenda Lee for Christmas	Released: 1960; Label: Decca; Formats: EP
Lover, Come Back to Me	Released: 1961; Label: Decca; Formats: EP
Fly Me to the Moon	Released: 1961; Label: Decca; Formats: EP
Dum Dum	Released: 1961; Label: Brunswick; Formats: EP
You Can Depend on Me	Released: 1961; Label: Brunswick; Formats: EP
Pretend	Released: 1961; Label: Brunswick; Formats: EP
Fool No. 1	Released: 1961; Label: Brunswick; Formats: EP
Emotions	Released: 1961; Label: Decca; Formats: EP
Brenda Lee	Released: 1961; Label: Decca; Formats: EP
Brenda Lee	Released: 1961; Label: Decca; Formats: EP
Dum Dum	Released: 1961; Label: Decca; Formats: EP
Anybody But Me	Released: 1961; Label: Decca; Formats: EP
All Alone Am I	Released: 1962; Label: Brunswick; Formats: EP
Break It to Me Gently	Released: 1962; Label: Decca; Formats: EP
Break It to Me Gently	Released: 1962; Label: Brunswick; Formats: EP
Heart in Hand	Released: 1962; Label: Brunswick; Formats: EP
Slow–Twist	Released: 1962; Label: Brunswick; Formats: EP
Speak to Me Pretty	Released: 1962; Label: Brunswick; Formats: EP
Brenda Lee, Vol. 9	Released: 1962; Label: Brunswick; Formats: EP
When You Loved Me	Released: 1963; Label: Brunswick; Formats: EP
Losing You (Un Ange Est Venu)	Released: 1963; Label: Brunswick; Formats: EP
Brenda Lee's Tribute To Al Jolson	Released: 1963; Label: Brunswick; Formats: EP
Thanks a Lot	Released: 1963; Label: Brunswick; Formats: EP
Kansas City/Lonely Lonely Lonely Me/If You Love Me (Hymne à l'amour)/Sweet Impossible You	Released: 1963; Label: Brunswick; Formats: EP
The End of the World	Released: 1963; Label: Decca; Formats: EP
Losing You	Released: 1963; Label: Brunswick; Formats: EP
I Wonder	Released: 1963; Label: Decca; Formats: EP
Brenda Lee Vol. 10	Released: 1963; Label: Brunswick; Formats: EP
Brenda Brilliant Songs	Released: 1964; Label: Decca; Formats: EP
Sing Along with Brenda	Released: 1964; Label: Decca; Formats: EP
Is It True?/Behind The Rainbow/When You Loved Me/He's Sure To Remember Me	Released: 1964; Label: Brunswick; Formats: EP
Is It True	Released: 1964; Label: Brunswick; Formats: EP
More "Mas"	Released: 1964; Label: Brunswick; Formats: EP
Brenda Sweet Heart	Released: 1964; Label: Brunswick; Formats: EP
As Usual	Released: 1964; Label: Brunswick; Formats: EP
As Usual	Released: 1964; Label: Decca; Formats: EP
The Grass Is Greener	Released: 1964; Label: Brunswick; Formats: EP
Merry Christmas from Brenda Lee	Released: 1964; Label: Decca; Formats: EP
Thanks a Lot	Released: 1965; Label: Decca; Formats: EP
The Crying Game	Released: Label: Formats:
Too Many Rivers	Released: 1965; Label: Brunswick; Formats: EP
Bye Bye Blues	Released: 1966; Label: Decca; Formats: EP
A Taste of Honey	Released: 1966; Label: Decca; Formats: EP
Coming on Strong	Released: 1966; Label: Decca; Formats: EP
Walk Away	Released: 1966; Label: Decca; Formats: EP
Coming on Strong	Released: 1966; Label: Decca; Formats: EP
Hello, Dolly	Released: 1966; Label: Decca; Formats: EP
Akasaka After Dark	Released: 1966; Label: Decca; Formats: EP
Ride, Ride, Ride	Released: 1967; Label: Decca; Formats: EP
Brenda Lee Best 4	Released: 1967; Label: Decca; Formats: EP
Brenda New Hits	Released: 1967; Label: Decca; Formats: EP

=== 1970s–2020s ===
List of extended plays (EP's), showing all relevant details
Title	EP details
The Best of Brenda Lee Vol. 1	Released: 1970; Label: MCA; Formats: EP
Brenda Lee Now	Released: 1976; Label: MCA; Formats: EP
A Rockin' Christmas with Brenda Lee	Released: November 3, 2023; Label: UMG; Formats: Digital

== Other album appearances ==
List of non-single guest appearances, with other performing artists, showing year released and album name
Title	Year	Other artist(s)	Album	Ref.
"Again and Again"	1980	—N/a	Smokey and the Bandit II	
“Made for Each Other”	1981	Alvin and the Chipmunks	Urban Chipmunk	
"Honky Tonk Angels Medley"	1988	k.d. lang Loretta Lynn; Kitty Wells	Shadowland	
"The Christmas Song"	1988	—N/a	Tennessee Christmas	
"Sweet Memories"	1990	Ricky Van Shelton	RVS III	
"You're in the Doghouse Now"	1990	—N/a	Dick Tracy	
“Silent Night/ O Come, All Ye Faithful”	1994	—N/a	Christmas With The Legends of Country	
"You'll Never Know"	1995	Willy DeVille	Loup Garou	
"Jambalaya/Is It True?/My Whole World/Sweet Nothin's/End of the World"	1995	Loretta Lynn	An Evening with Loretta Lynn	
"Grandma's Feather Bed"	1995	—N/a	Big Country For One and All	
"Life Is Just a Bowl of Cherries"	1998	Perry Como	Perry-Go-Round	
"Music Music Music /Ricochet”	2001	Jimmy Sturr	Gone Polka	
"Those Were the Days" (credited as "The Opry Gang")	2005	Dolly Parton	Those Were the Days	
"Just A Little Talk With Jesus (Live)"	2007	Gaither	Amazing Grace	
“Let It Be Me”	2007	Charlie Daniels Band	Deuces	
"You Can't Rollerstake in a Buffalo Herd"	2018	Bill Anderson, John Anderson, Bellamy Brothers, Roy Clark, Larry Gatlin, Bobby Goldsboro, Roger Miller, Tanya Tucker	King of the Road: A Tribute to Roger Miller	
