= A Brenda Lee Christmas: In the New Old Fashioned Way =

Studio album by Brenda Lee
- Released: September 1991
- Genres: Country; Christmas
- Label: Warner Bros.
- Producers: Jim Ed Norman; Eric Prestidge

Brenda Lee chronology
Brenda Lee (1991)	A Brenda Lee Christmas: In the New Old Fashioned Way (1991)	21 All-Time Greatest Hits (1996)

A Brenda Lee Christmas: In the New Old Fashioned Way is the thirty-third studio album by American singer, Brenda Lee. It was released in September 1991 by Warner Bros. Records and was her second studio album of Christmas music. The album's creation was derived from the early 1990s revival of her holiday song, "Rockin' Around the Christmas Tree". The collection featured 13 songs, including several re-recordings of Christmas tunes from Lee's first holiday collection. It received mixed reviews from critics following its release.

== Background ==
Brenda Lee was a top-selling pop singer in the 1960s due to a string of international top-10 and number one singles. She was reinvented as a country performer in the 1970s and had commercial success in the genre through the 1980s. She then signed to Warner Bros. Records and the label released an eponymous studio collection in 1991. Lee explained in her autobiography that the recent revival of her holiday hit, "Rockin' Around the Christmas Tree", inspired the making of Lee's second Christmas-themed studio album. Ronnie Shacklett (Lee's husband and manager in the 1990s) convinced Warner Bros. to make the album and Lee began recording the project in 1991.

== Recording and content ==
A Brenda Lee Christmas consisted of 13 tracks co-produced by Jim Ed Norman and Eric Prestidge. Many of the songs were re-recordings originally made for her 1964 LP, Merry Christmas from Brenda Lee. Re-recorded tunes included "Rockin' Around the Christmas Tree" and "Santa Claus Is Coming to Town". The new material (never before recorded by Lee) were the album's religious tracks, such as "Joy to the World" and "O Come All Ye Faithful". Lee later said that "Go Tell It on the Mountain" was among her favorites from the project.

== Release and critical reception ==
A Brenda Lee Christmas was released by Warner Bros. Records in September 1991 and was offered in two formats: a compact disc (CD) or a cassette. The album received mixed reviews from critics following its release. Carma Wadley of the Deseret News gave it a positive response, writing, "Lee serves up a pleasant rendition of familiar songs. The overall feeling rings true to her style". Orla Swift of the Record-Journal gave the collection a "C" rating, finding that it lacked the "bouncy" material from previous discs. "Instead we get heavy-handed, trudging treatments of otherwise pretty songs," she wrote. The Chicago Tribune believed it would "appeal to several crowds" but found covers of "Joy to the World" and "Silent Night" to be "pretty square for a woman once nicknamed Little Miss Dynamite". However, the newspaper concluded that Lee's voice ultimately made them "first rate carols". Marvin Jolly of AllMusic called the disc "among the best of the singer's many holiday recordings", but only gave it a two-star rating out of five.

== Track listing ==
A Brenda Lee Christmas: In the New Old Fashioned Way
No.	Title	Writer(s)	Length
1.	"Rockin' Around the Christmas Tree"	Johnny Marks	2:08
2.	"White Christmas"	Irving Berlin	3:23
3.	"Little Drummer Boy"	Katherine K. Davis; Henry Onorati; Harry Simone	3:22
4.	"O Come All Ye Faithful"	Traditional	2:58
5.	"Santa Claus Is Coming to Town"	Fred Coots; Haven Gillespie	2:16
6.	"What Child Is This"	Traditional	2:58
7.	"Joy to the World"	Traditional	2:14
8.	"Go Tell It on the Mountain"	Traditional	2:26
9.	"Silver Bells"	Jay Livingston; Ray Evans	2:57
10.	"The Christmas Song"	Mel Tormé; Robert Wells	3:20
11.	"Silent Night"	Traditional	2:15
12.	"Let It Snow! Let It Snow! Let It Snow!"	Sammy Cahn; Jule Styne	1:47
13.	"Have Yourself a Merry Little Christmas"	Hugh Martin; Ralph Blane	3:43

== Personnel ==
All credits are adapted from the liner notes of A Brenda Lee Christmas: In the New Old Fashioned Way.

Musical personnel

- Doug Clements – Backing vocals
- Mark Douthit – Saxophone, soloist
- James Ferguson – Backing vocals
- Steve Gibson – Electric guitar
- Dennis Good – Trombone
- Barry Green – Trombone
- Mike Haynes – Trumpet
- John Hug – Acoustic guitar
- Wendy Johnson – Backing vocals
- Jana King – Backing vocals
- Brenda Lee – Lead vocals
- Paul Leim – Drums
- Tom McAninch – Horn
- Nashville String Machine – Orchestra, strings
- Chris McDonald – Trombone
- Farrell Morris – Percussion
- Bobby Odgen – Piano
- Billy Puett – Flute, saxophone
- Ebby Ramm – Horn
- John Sheffield – Trumpet
- Lisa Silver – Backing vocals
- Bobby Taylor – Oboe
- George Tidwell – Trumpet
- Glenn Worf – Bass
- Cindy Wyatt – Harp

Technical personnel

- Kevin Anderson – Engineer
- Mark Coddington – Engineer
- Noah Dewey – Engineer
- Carl Gorodetzky – Contractor
- Larry Jefferies – Engineer
- Danny Kee – Production assistant
- Dave LaBarre – Engineer
- Brenda Lee – Liner notes
- Laura LiPuma – Art direction
- Glenn Meadows – Mastering
- Mark McCarthy – Engineer
- Keith Odle – Digital multi-track editing
- Tikm Nikosey – Lettering
- Jim Ed Norman – Producer
- Eric Prestidge – Producer, mastering, mixing, recording
- Todd Robbins – Engineer
- Bob Tassi – Engineer
- James "Val" Veluntini – Engineer
- Bergen White – Arranger, conductor

== Release history ==
Release history and formats for A Brenda Lee Christmas: In the New Old Fashioned Way
Region	Date	Format	Label	Ref.
Various	September 1991	Compact disc; cassette	Warner Bros. Records	
Various	Circa 2020	Music download; streaming	Warner Records	
