= A Sweeter Love (I'll Never Know) =

Single by Brenda Lee
- B-side: "A Woman's Mind"
- Released: July 1984
- Genre: Country
- Length: 2:52
- Label: MCA
- Songwriter: Jerry Crutchfield
- Producer: Jerry Crutchfield

Brenda Lee singles chronology
"Didn't We Do It Good" (1983)	"A Sweeter Love (I'll Never Know)" (1984)	"I'm Takin' My Time" (1985)

"A Sweeter Love (I'll Never Know)" is a song written by Jerry Crutchfield that was recorded by American singer, Brenda Lee. The ballad was released as a single by MCA Records in 1984 and made the top 40 of the US country chart that year, becoming one of Lee's final top 40 placements in her career.

== Background, recording and content ==
Brenda Lee went from being one of the top-selling pop music artists of the 1960s to a top-selling country music artist in the 1970s and 1980s. She had continued chart success in the country genre into the 1980s, which included "A Sweeter Love (I'll Never Know)". According to Lee, she had become increasingly disappointed by the lack of success with previous singles and decided to switch producers. She was given permission by MCA label-head, Jim Foglesong, to work with Jerry Crutchfield in 1983. The second Crutchfield production was "A Sweeter Love". The song told the story a romance that was destined to never materialize and was penned by Crutcfield himself.

== Release, critical reception and chart performance ==
"A Sweeter Love (I'll Never Know)" was released by MCA Records in July 1984 as a seven-inch vinyl record with the B-side, "A Woman's Mind". The song was reviewed positively by Billboard magazine who placed it among its "Top Single Picks" in July 1984, finding that Lee performed it in "a bittersweet, contemplative tone". Cash Box named it one of its "Feature Picks" the same month. It debuted on the US Billboard Hot Country Songs chart on August 11, 1984 and spent 16 weeks there, peaking at the number 22 position on October 6. It would be one of Lee's final country top 40 entries in her career.

== Track listing ==
7" vinyl single

- "A Sweeter Love (I'll Never Know)" – 2:52
- "A Woman's Mind" – 3:19

== Charts ==
Weekly chart performance for "A Sweeter Love (I'll Never Know)"
Chart (1984)	Peak position
US Hot Country Songs (Billboard)	22
