= Brenda Lee =

American singer (born 1944)

- Lee in 2006
- Born: Brenda Mae Tarpley; December 11, 1944 (age 81); Atlanta, Georgia, US
- Occupation: Singer
- Years active: 1955–present
- Works: Albums; singles
- Spouse: Ronnie Shacklett (m. 1963)
- Children: 2
- Musical career
- Origin: Nashville, Tennessee, US
- Genres: Rock and roll; rockabilly; pop; country; gospel
- Instruments: Vocals
- Labels: Decca; MCA; Elektra; Monument; Warner Bros.; Brenda Lee Productions; Provident
- Website: brendaleeofficial.com

Brenda Mae Tarpley (born December 11, 1944) known professionally as Brenda Lee, is an American singer. Known for her musical versatility, she had commercial success with recordings in the genres of pop, country, rock and roll and gospel. She was also one of the best-selling music artists of the 1960s. Her Christmas song "Rockin' Around the Christmas Tree" (1958) reached number 1 on the U.S. Billboard Hot 100 in December 2023 after a music video was released for the song, making Lee the oldest artist ever to reach number 1. She has been inducted into both the Country Music Hall of Fame and the Rock and Roll Hall of Fame.

Lee was considered a child prodigy for her ability to sing from a young age. After making appearances on 1950s television programs, she signed a recording contract with Decca Records (later named MCA) at age 11. Her earliest recordings were rock and roll, first achieving a commercial breakthrough with "Sweet Nothin's" (1959). Her music shifted towards pop after reaching number 1 with "I'm Sorry" (1960). That year, "Rockin' Around the Christmas Tree" was re-released and became a commercial success for the first time. This new style appealed to teens and adults. Lee had a series of Top 10 hits in multiple countries including "Fool No. 1" (1961), "Break It to Me Gently" (1961), "All Alone Am I" (1962) and "Losing You" (1963). Her single "One Rainy Night in Tokyo" (1965), recorded in Japanese reached the Top 10 in Japan.

Lee then experimented with different musical styles, including an album of New Orleans music titled For the First Time (1968) and a soul-inspired project titled Memphis Portrait (1970). After several personal challenges, Lee was reinvented as a country music artist in adulthood. This began with the country song "Nobody Wins" (1973). She then reached the Top 10 with "Sunday Sunrise" (1973), "Big Four Poster Bed" (1974) and "Rock on Baby" (1974). L. A. Sessions (1976), a pop album, did poorly and Lee reverted back to the country genre again with "Tell Me What It's Like" (1979), which reached the Top 10. She had two more Top 10 country songs through 1981 and recorded country-flavored albums until leaving MCA in 1986.

"Rockin' Around the Christmas Tree" received another revival when it was featured in the film Home Alone (1990). Warner Bros. signed Lee to a new contract and released Brenda Lee (1991), which failed to become a commercial success. It was followed by A Brenda Lee Christmas: In the New Old Fashioned Way (1991). Lee recorded and performed with less frequency during the 1990s and 2000s. Among her new material was a collection of gospel material titled Gospel Duets with Treasured Friends (2007). In 2023, "Rockin' Around the Christmas Tree" topped the US charts after Lee issued a music video to promote the track.

== Early life ==
Brenda Mae Tarpley was born on December 11, 1944, at Emory University Hospital in Atlanta, Georgia. She was the second of four children born to Annie Grayce Yarbrough and Ruben Lindsey Tarpley. Her father served in the United States Army for 11 years and then worked various labor jobs, including carpentry, factory work, and construction. Her mother also found factory work in cotton mills. When Tarpley was born, she was one month premature and weighed 4 pounds 11 ounces (2.1 kg). She was given the name Brenda by her mother and was nicknamed "Bootie Mae" by her father.

The family rented various three-room houses around the Metro Atlanta area while Ruben worked as a carpenter and survived on roughly $20 per week. After Ruben broke his arm in 1951, he was temporarily unemployed and the family lived on a tenant farm in Conyers, Georgia. Tarpley attended Conyers Elementary School in 1951. After Ruben's recovery, the family moved to a clapboard house in Lithonia, Georgia, where Tarpley slept on one bed with her siblings. Most of her childhood toys were made by her father and her grandmother made many of her dresses.

Tarpley began singing along to the radio as early as eight months old and won her first talent contest at age five singing "Take Me Out to the Ball Game". She then entered a talent contest at Conyers Elementary School where she sang "Too Young" and "Slow Poke", but ultimately lost to an 18-month-old. She continued entering talent shows singing songs by Hank Williams and Peggy Lee. In 1952, she began performing with the Wranglers at the Sports Arena venue in Atlanta. She also performed on local television in Atlanta on TV Ranch, singing "Hey, Good Lookin'" by Hank Williams at seven years old.

In 1953, Tarpley's father was working a construction job when a hammer fell off a scaffold and struck him on the head. Knocked unconscious, he was brought to a hospital, where doctors performed brain surgery. He died shortly afterward and the family was left "penniless", leaving Tarpley to help provide for the family through her singing gigs. Without a car, they traveled by bus from Lithonia to Atlanta on a weekly basis so Tarpley could perform. A local television producer during this time suggested a stage name because "Brenda Tarpley" was hard to remember. Soon she adopted the stage name "Brenda Lee". Her mother then remarried and her family briefly moved to Cincinnati, Ohio, and Augusta, Georgia. In Augusta, she attended North Augusta Elementary School and junior high school. Her stepfather became her manager in 1955 and booked shows around the Atlanta area.

== Career ==
=== 1955–1958: National TV exposure and early rock recordings ===
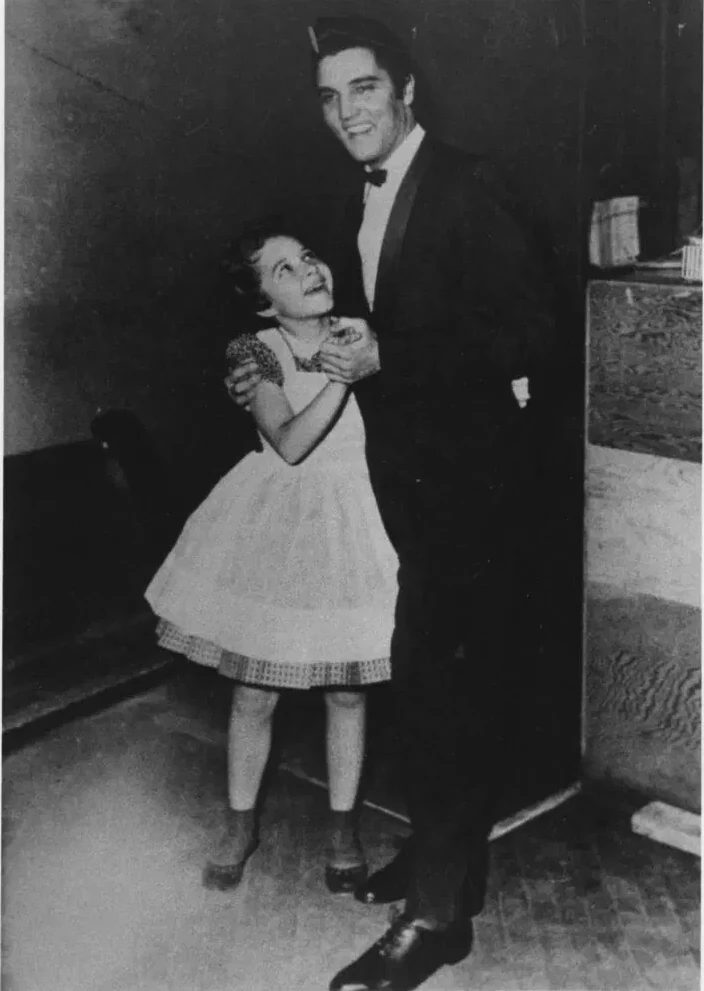
Lee poses with Elvis Presley, 1957.

Lee's breakthrough came in February 1955, when she turned down $30 to appear on a Georgia radio station to see Red Foley and a touring promotional unit of his ABC-TV program Ozark Jubilee in Augusta. An Augusta disc jockey persuaded Foley to hear her sing before the show. Foley did and agreed to let her perform "Jambalaya (On the Bayou)" on stage that night. At age 11, Foley signed her as a regular cast member of the Ozark Jubilee in 1956. Lee and her mother then traveled by bus to Springfield, Missouri, where she made her debut on the program, singing "Jambalaya" by Hank Williams. Lee's new manager, Lou Black, and her stepfather attempted to get her a recording contract, but were turned down by every label. According to Lee, many companies were hesitant about signing a child performer. Foley then coaxed his Nashville record label to watch Lee perform. Lee was signed by his company, Decca Records, in May 1956.

Despite being 11 years old, Decca issued her debut single, "Jambalaya (On the Bayou)", under the name "Little Brenda Lee (9 Years Old)". Decca's second single also featured Lee billed under that name. Both the A-side and B-side were novelty Christmas tunes: "I'm Gonna Lasso Santa Claus" and "Christy Christmas". Her initial releases identified Lee with the rock and roll market. During this time, her Ozark Jubilee performances were seen by New York columnist Jack O'Brien, who wrote an article about her. That led to Lee being booked on The Perry Como Show, The Steve Allen Show, and The Ed Sullivan Show. After a performance at the Nashville Disc Jockey Convention, Lou Black died of a heart attack. She was connected to Dub Albritten, who became her personal manager the same year and remained in that position for many years. Among the first gigs Albritten booked for Lee was at the Flamingo Hotel in Las Vegas in December 1956.

Lee then went to New York City to record her third Decca release with producer Milt Gabler, "One Step at a Time". Released in 1957, it became her first US charting single, rising to number 43 on the Hot 100 and number 15 on the Hot Country Songs chart. Its followup, "Dynamite", rose to number 72 on the US Hot 100 and gave her the nickname "Little Miss Dynamite". Lee also credited Steve Allen for the nickname after he said it on the air in 1956. Lee then was booked for a series of rock and roll package tours in 1957, in which she performed alongside Ricky Nelson, Bill Haley & His Comets, George Hamilton IV, and Patsy Cline (who became a good friend). In 1958, Lee's production was taken over by Owen Bradley, who served in the role over the next 10 years. The same year and at age 13, she recorded a new Christmas tune called "Rockin' Around the Christmas Tree", which eventually became a Top 40 US single in 1960.

=== 1959–1963: Rock and pop music breakthrough ===
Despite Lee's popularity with teen audiences through rock and roll, Albritten believed the music was a "fad" and morphed her style toward pop. He brought Lee to France in 1959 after noticing her records' popularity there, and billed her with French pop performer Gilbert Becaud. According to Lee, Albritten tried to generate hype about her visit by telling French press that she was a "32-year-old midget". Despite the unwarranted press, Lee recalled her French shows as a success with audiences. The same year, Lee's recording of "Let's Jump the Broomstick" reached the Top 20 on the UK Singles Chart. She returned to Nashville that summer to record the rock and roll tune "Sweet Nothin's" with Owen Bradley. The song became her first Top 10 single in the US and the UK, peaking at number 4 in both countries.

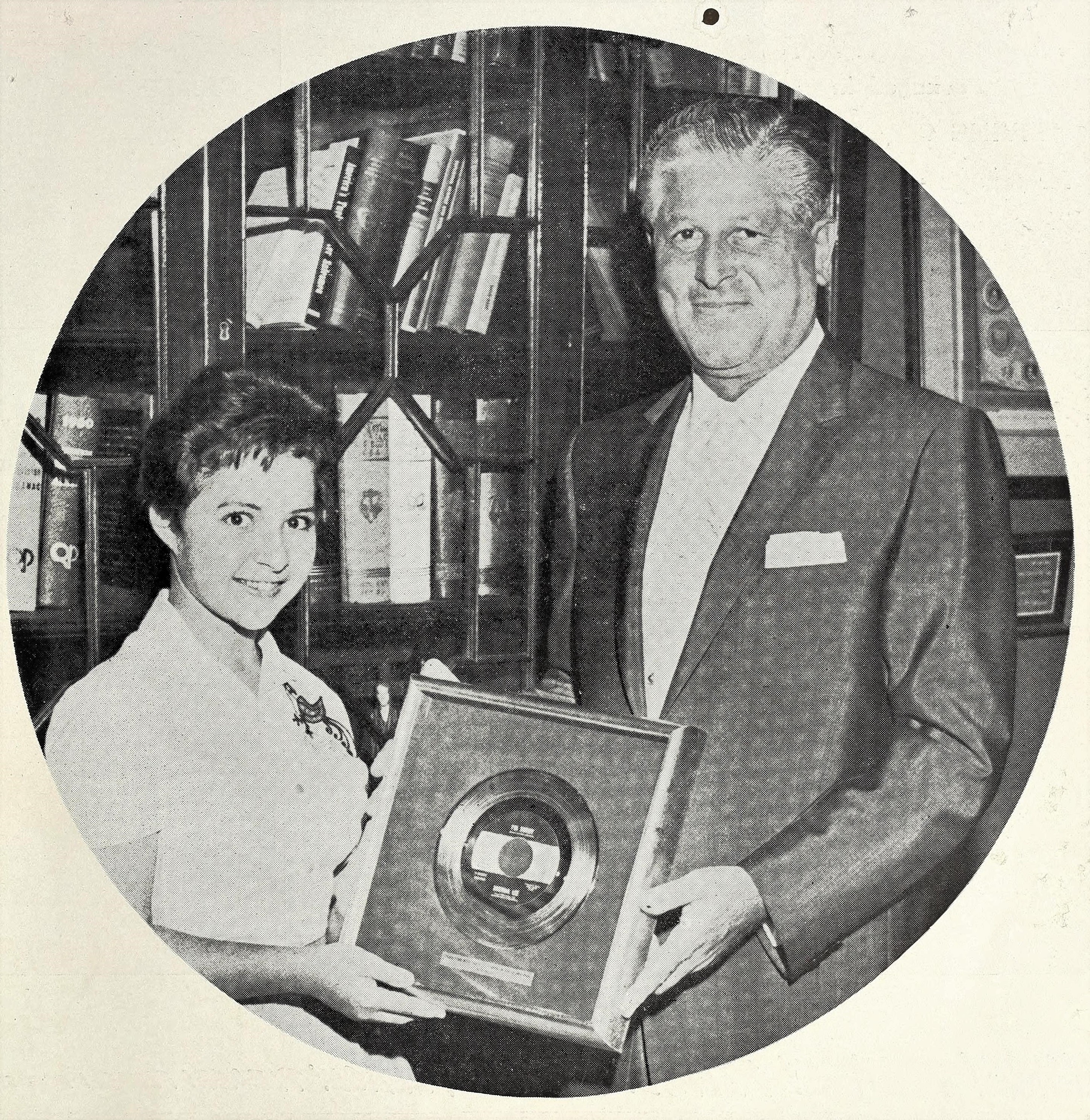
Lee presented with a gold record for "I'm Sorry" in 1960

In 1960, Albritten brought Bradley the pop ballad "I'm Sorry" for Lee to record. After recording, Bradley believed the song to be a hit, but Decca Records rejected it, theorizing that the song was too mature for Lee to record. Instead, "I'm Sorry" was issued as the B-side to the rock tune "That's All You Gotta Do". The A-side reached the Top 10 in the US and Australia, while "I'm Sorry" became Lee's first US number 1 single, spending three weeks at top spot. Bradley then found the Italian ballad "Per Tutta la Vita", which was translated into "I Want to Be Wanted". It became her second number 1 song in the US, second Australian Top 10 single, and first (and only) Top 10 US R&B single. A third ballad, "Emotions", reached upper ten placement on US and Belgian charts in late 1960. Her hit recordings were then included on corresponding LPs, two of which made the Top 10 of the US Billboard 200 chart: Brenda Lee and This Is...Brenda (both 1960).

Lee was among pop music's best-selling artists during the early 1960s. Her ballads appealed to teenagers and adults alike. Between 1961 and 1963, nine of Lee's ballads made the Top 10 in the US, UK, or Australia: "You Can Depend on Me", "Dum Dum", "Fool No. 1", "Break It to Me Gently", "Speak to Me Pretty", "Everybody Loves Me But You", "Here Comes That Feeling", "All Alone Am I", and "Losing You". The singles appeared in several of Lee's studio LPs, including two that made the US Billboard Top 40: All the Way (1961) and Brenda, That's All (1962). Her 1963 album All Alone Am I reached number 8 in the UK.

Decca and her manager further marketed Lee toward straight pop as she neared adulthood, having her appear in supper clubs and record standards. Studio LPs like 1962's Sincerely targeted adult audiences by centering completely on American standard tunes. Lee and her touring band (The Casuals) regularly appeared in club venues across New York, Boston, and Las Vegas. They were often backed by full orchestras complete with comedy sketches and Great American Songbook medleys. A 1963 review by Billboard magazine compared her nightclub routine to that of early 20th-century performer Sophie Tucker. Lee also found work in Europe, including a 1962 Hamburg, Germany, performance that featured The Beatles. Lee also continued her education, hiring a tutor to accompany her on tour. Albritten later moved her out of Nashville's public schools into Los Angeles's Hollywood Professional School, where she had classes with Peggy Lipton and Connie Stevens.

=== 1964–1970: International success and musical expansion ===
By 1964, Lee's musical career had expanded beyond English-speaking countries. She began recording her most popular songs in Spanish, German, Italian and French. The 1964 German singles "Wiedersehn ist Wunderschön" and "Ich Will Immer Auf Dich Warten" made the Top 40 on its pop chart. The same year, Mickie Most produced a single originally intended for the UK market, "Is It True". It later reached number 17 in both the US and the UK. The popularity of her various discs led to longer international tours. In her autobiography, Lee recalled appearing overseas more frequently in 1964 than in her home country. In November 1964, she joined Bob Newhart and Lena Horne in the Royal Variety Show, where she performed for Queen Elizabeth II of England. Albritten also wanted Lee to record for the Japanese market because he believed it was "largely untapped" by US performers. In July 1965, "One Rainy Night in Tokyo" (recorded mostly in Japanese) rose into the upper ten on the Japanese national chart. Lee then embarked on a twelve-day tour of Japan, which attracted audiences of more than 5,000 per concert. Lee recorded several more albums of Japanese material over the next decade and toured there over the next 25 years.

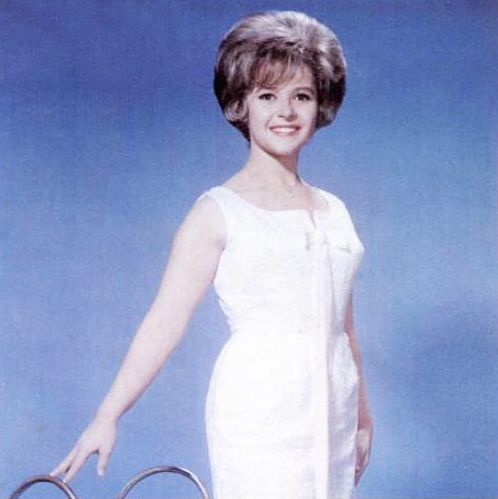
Lee promotional photo, 1965

Meanwhile, Lee was brought back to Nashville to continue recording for her main market. Decca issued two 1964 studio albums of Lee's material that made the US LP chart: By Request and Merry Christmas from Brenda Lee. Included on the albums were the US Top 40 singles "The Grass Is Greener", "As Usual", and "Rockin' Around the Christmas Tree". In between two UK tours, Lee recorded the 1965 studio album Brenda Lee Sings Top Teen Hits. The album targeted the teen market and featured her singing popular youth hits of the period As the music of the British Invasion overtook radio airwaves, Lee's singles made progressively lower positions on the popularity charts, with some exceptions. Two exceptions were "Too Many Rivers" (1965) and "Coming on Strong" (1966), with both made the US Top 40. These singles also made the US Adult Contemporary chart. Between 1962 and 1965, thirteen of Lee's songs made the Top 10 of the chart.

With declining radio airplay, Owen Bradley and Lee made attempts at expanding her musical style. In 1967, he brought in the Hollywood String Quartet to play on her blues-inspired project Reflections in Blue. She then experimented with New Orleans music on the 1968 Pete Fountain collaboration For the First Time. Lee remembered that both albums failed to gain attention from the public. But both received critical acclaim for showcasing Lee's music in new forms. Due to disappointing record sales and several failed attempts at success, Bradley temporarily stopped working with Lee. He helped her find Mike Berniker and Lee went to New York City to make her next album with him.

During this period, she heard Willie Nelson singing "Johnny One Time" on the radio and had the idea to record it from a woman's perspective. She went into the studio with Berniker to record the track. Lee's version of "Johnny One Time" rose to number 41 on the US Hot 100 and number 3 on the US adult contemporary chart in 1969, becoming her highest-peaking single in several years. Its corresponding album of the same name made a brief appearance on the US LP's chart in 1969. For her next album, Lee traveled to Memphis, Tennessee to record with Chips Moman on a soul-inspired project, Memphis Portrait. Its lead single, "I Think I Love You Again", only reached number 97 in the US in 1970.

=== 1971–1978: Country music comeback and pop experimentation ===
Lee experienced several personal and professional challenges during the early 1970s. In 1971, Albritten died, while she also experienced vocal cord damage and abdominal issues. She also felt professionally stuck after many production shifts, leading to a reunification with Bradley as her producer in 1971. Song publisher Bob Beckham then brought Lee the Kris Kristofferson-penned tune "Nobody Wins" and she agreed to record it for the newly renamed MCA Records. The song rose to number 5 on the US country chart and number 1 on Canada's Country Tracks chart in 1973, redefining Lee as a country music artist. It appeared on Lee's first country-focused LP, Brenda, which made the US country albums Top 10 in 1973.

Lee remained identified with the mainstream country genre over the next several years. She made appearances on country-themed television shows such as Hee Haw (1972), presented a country accolade at the 15th Annual Grammy Awards (1973). and had five more Top 10 country singles between 1973 and 1975. She followed "Nobody Wins" with the number 6 US country songs "Sunday Sunrise" and "Wrong Ideas". The latter was by poet and songwriter Shel Silverstein, who became a friend of Lee's and wrote more of her music. He wrote 1974's "Big Four Poster Bed", which were US and Canadian country hits in 1974. Both of her next two singles, "Rock on Baby" and "He's My Rock", were US and Canadian country hits. They were included on Lee's next three country-focused studio LPs: New Sunrise (1973), Brenda Lee Now (1974), and Sincerely, Brenda Lee (1975). Critics compared them to her 1960s LP's due to their use of cover tunes and similar track layouts.

Through 1976, the singles "Bringing It Back" and "Find Yourself Another Puppet" made the US and Canadian country Top 40 charts. Lee also campaigned for Jimmy Carter at his 1976 Nashville birthday event. During this time, Bradley retired from the music industry and MCA pressured Lee into being produced by Los Angeles-based Snuff Garrett. The resulting album was 1976's L. A. Sessions, which aimed to rebrand her as a 1970s pop recording artist. Its two singles failed to make the pop chart and instead reached lower on the US country chart, leaving Lee disappointed in the album's lack of success. She then traveled to Muscle Shoals, Alabama, to record a disco-oriented project that was ultimately shelved. Her manager, David Skepner, helped her secure a new recording contract with Elektra Records in 1978, which released the single "Left Over Love".

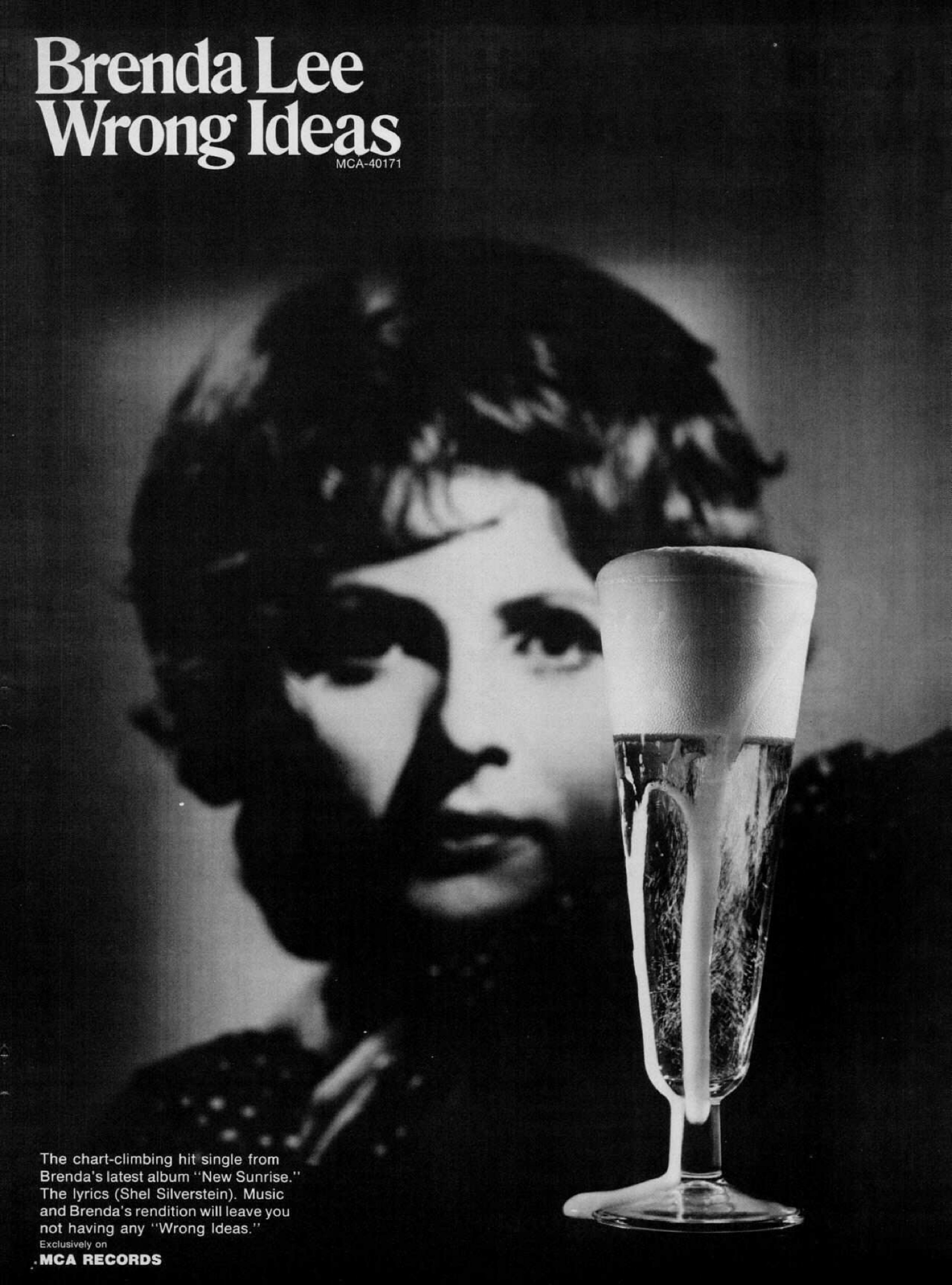
Lee made a comeback in the 1970s when she returned as a country music artist. As a result, she had a string of hit singles, including "Wrong Ideas" (pictured above).

=== 1979–1987: Second country comeback ===
In 1979, Jim Foglesong re-signed Lee to MCA Records. He teamed her with producer, Ron Chancey, and the pair had instant musical chemistry, according to Lee. Chancey brought in soul music elements to update her sound on the country single "Tell Me What It's Like". Reaching number 8 on the US country chart, it became her first Top 10 single in nearly five years and received a nomination from the Grammy Awards the next year. The country comeback made Lee among several women of the era who made successful returns to the genre like Dottie West and Billie Jo Spears. Her next single, "The Cowgirl and the Dandy", was a reworking of Bobby Goldsboro's "The Cowboy and the Lady" that had first been recorded by Dolly Parton. Lee's version reached the Top 10 of both the US and Canadian country charts in 1980, leading to the release of 1980's Even Better, which featured both songs. Critics praised Lee's "powerful" and "torchy" vocals on the LP and highlighted its new and modern sound.

In 1980, Lee also made an acting appearance and performed in the soundtrack for the film Smokey and the Bandit II. MCA coaxed her back into the studio to make a followup to Even Better, Take Me Back (1980). The LP was her first in four years to make the US country chart, rising to number 30. It was critically acclaimed for its use of string instrumentation and was positively compared to Anne Murray. Its lead single, "Broken Trust", featured the Oak Ridge Boys and rose into the US country Top 10 in 1981. Lee then agreed to be part of the soundtrack for Neil Simon's film Only When I Laugh. She recorded the movie's title tune, which was ultimately not included in the film but was featured in the soundtrack. The single version rose high into the US country chart in 1981 and was the lead release of Lee's 1981 album of the same name.

Lee hosted her own radio show in 1982, Brenda Lee's Country Profile, which featured in-depth interviews with country artists and found airtime on 25 US radio stations. In an effort to save Monument Records from bankruptcy, Lee joined Kris Kristofferson, Willie Nelson and Dolly Parton to record the 1982 compilation The Winning Hand. The album featured new and previously recorded tracks by all four artists, along with solo and duet tracks. Lee and Nelson's duet "You're Gonna Love Yourself in the Morning" made the US country chart in 1983, while the album made the US country Top 10. The four performers then promoted the project in a two-hour television special in 1985. Lee said she was never paid for recording The Winning Hand due to Monument Records' downfall after its release.

Between 1982 and 1984, most of Lee's singles made progressively lower US country chart positions. Songs like "Fool Fool", "Enough for You" and "Just for the Moment" did not reach the Top 40. Believing she needed a production change, Lee teamed up with songwriter and producer Jerry Crutchfield in 1983. She filmed a music video for their first single together, "Didn't We Do It Good" but the song only rose to number 75. Their next release, "A Sweeter Love (I'll Never Know)", made the US country top 30 in 1984, prompting Lee to cut an entire Crutchfield-produced LP. But the project was shelved. Lee said that new MCA president Jimmy Bowen rejected its release. Fearing Bowen would drop her from MCA, in 1984 Lee found a new record producer, Emory Gordy Jr. Bowen gave the Gordy-produced project his blessing and the resulting album, Feels So Right, was issued in 1985. Its uptempo song selection was praised by music critics, but its singles only rose into the lower reaches of the US country chart. Lee believed that its lack of success resulted in her being dropped by MCA in 1986, along with several veteran country artists.

=== 1988–2009: Musical changes and career slow-down ===
In 1988, Lee sued MCA for $20 million, citing years of unpaid royalties that was eventually settled out-of-court in 1989. Officially without a record label, Lee still found concert work with club dates both in the US and internationally. She also joined the cast of a Broadway-inspired show at Nashville's Opryland theme park called Music Music Music, claiming to play 1,200 shows for three seasons between 1988 and 1990. In 1990, "Rockin' Around the Christmas Tree" received a revival in radio airplay when it was featured in the film Home Alone, leading to it to continuously garner airplay during the holiday season. Owen Bradley also sought her out during this period to appear on k.d. lang's album Shadowland, which attracted the attention of Carl Scott, a Warner Bros. executive who encouraged Lee to record again. She officially signed with Warner's Nashville division in 1989 and had interest from Mark Knopfler in producing her next project.

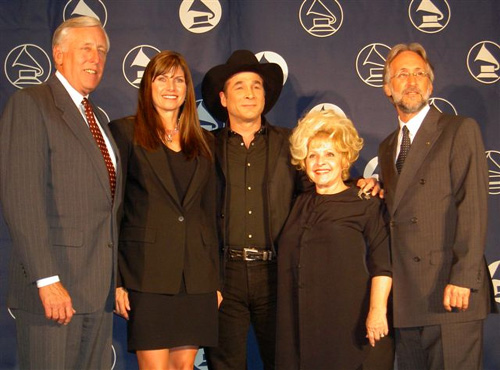
Lee poses with country artist, Clint Black, along with US Congresswoman, Steny Hoyer, and Recording Academy president, Neil Portnow (2006).

According to Lee, Warner Bros. had her travel to Los Angeles to receive a makeover. The company convinced her to dye her hair blonde and lose several pounds for the album cover. The resulting project was released in April 1991 as an eponymous disc that featured co-production from Jim Ed Norman and Eric Prestidge. Along with new material were reworkings of songs by Sophie Tucker, Lefty Frizzell and Billie Jo Spears. The disc rose low on the US country albums chart, and its lead single ("Your One and Only)" barely entered the Canadian country chart. Reviews were mixed from critics, with Billboard calling it "powerful" while AllMusic called it "slick" and "forgettable". Lee theorized her long absence from recording and being in her mid forties at the time contributed to the album's lack of success. In the fall of 1991, Warner Bros. released another studio collection called A Brenda Lee Christmas: In the New Old Fashioned Way. The holiday album included a remake of "Rockin' Around the Christmas Tree", along with twelve other covers like "Santa Claus Is Coming to Town" and "The Little Drummer Boy".

As Lee devoted more time to domestic activities in the 1990s, she cut her performance schedule down significantly. She also dabbled in songwriting, notably co-writing "The Kind of Fool Love Makes", which appeared on Wynonna Judd's 1997 album The Other Side and Kenny Rogers's 1999 release She Rides Wild Horses. Lee also performed in honor of Owen Bradley at the 1994 The Recording Academy where he received their Governors Award. In 1996, Lee self-released an album of re-recordings titled 21 All-Time Greatest Hits. She was then approached by Mel Tillis in late 1996 to be a co-headliner with him in his Branson, Missouri theater. Lee agreed to his offer and moved to Branson for the engagement, where the pair played 400 shows during the 1997 tourist season. Via her own label (Brenda Lee Productions), Lee released an album of gospel music in 1997 titled Precious Memories, which was sold at her Branson shows that year. In 1999, it was discovered that Lee had vocal cord cysts. She opted out of an invasive surgery and instead took time off from performing, which ultimately lessened the damage to her voice.

In June 2001, Lee was among 60 country and Christian music artists to participate in a recording of "America the Beautiful". The idea to record an all-star version was crafted by television producer, Norman Lear, and aired the song as part of a television special that was broadcast on July 4, 2001. The recorded version was released as a single and rose to number 58 on the US country chart in 2001. During this time, Lee also began writing her autobiography and sought assistance from Nashville writer Robert K. Oermann and her own daughter, Julie Clay. After a year making a book proposal, she found a publisher in New York City and Little Miss Dynamite: The Life and Times of Brenda Lee was released in March 2002. In 2007, she fulfilled a promise to her mother by making another gospel album, which was released by the Provident label called Gospel Duets with Treasured Friends. The collection featured duets with Emmylou Harris, Huey Lewis, Dolly Parton and others. Lee continued performing into the 2000s, including a 2005 two-holiday concert in Indiana, a 2006 Branson residency with Frankie Avalon and a 2009 Massachusetts holiday concert with Johnny Tillotson.

=== 2010–present: Sporadic performing and holiday music revival ===
Lee continued to remain semi-active in her career by performing roughly a dozen concerts a year. She made an appearance at the Grand Ole Opry in 2012 and on the CMA Country Christmas television special in 2013. When Billboard modified its music chart recurrent rules in 2012, "Rockin' Around the Christmas Tree" has regularly returned to the Hot 100 since 2015.

On the Hot 100 chart dated December 21, 2019, "Rockin' Around the Christmas Tree" reached a new peak of number 3 in the US with 37.1 million streams and 5,000 digital sales sold. It reached number 2 the following week. From 2019 to 2022, the song has re-peaked at number 2, blocked from the top position by Mariah Carey's "All I Want for Christmas Is You".

On the chart dated December 9, 2023, "Rockin' Around the Christmas Tree" topped the Hot 100 for the first time, becoming Lee's third chart topper and the first since her 1960 single "I Want to Be Wanted". At 78, Lee became the oldest female artist and oldest performer overall to top the Hot 100, feats formerly held by Cher and Louis Armstrong, respectively. The next week, she held the top spot, which also meant she surpassed her own age record, having turned 79 during the week ending December 16. After two weeks off number 1, on the week ending January 6, 2024, she returned to the top for an additional week. Lee released a music video to celebrate the song's 65th anniversary in 2023 that featured her lip-synching to the original recording at a house party with Tanya Tucker and Trisha Yearwood. Lee has also joined TikTok to promote the song, where she posted videos reminiscing about its history and success. After a performing hiatus, Lee returned to sing the track at a benefit concert on December 5, 2023 and on December 7 for NBC's Christmas at the Opry television special.

Lee approved an AI-generated Spanish-language version, "Noche Buena y Navidad", that appeared on October 25, 2024. In December 2024, Spotify revealed that "Rockin' Around the Christmas Tree" is among the ten most-streamed holiday songs of all time, with more than a billion streams. The Recording Industry Association of America also certified "Rockin' Around the Christmas Tree" that month for 7× Platinum for US sales of 7 million copies of the digital single.

== Personal life ==
=== Dating, marriage and family life ===
Lee had interest in dating in her teens but her mother would not allow it until she turned 16. After her birthday, she co-headlined a tour with teen pop singer, Fabian, and accepted his offer to a date. Lee recounted that on a stroll with Fabian, her mother, manager and members of her touring band could be seen hiding in shrubbery to make sure she avoided trouble. "Needless to say, it ruined my night," she later said. She later expanded on the situation in her autobiography, writing, "I don't think he even kissed me. He did seem fond of me, however." Lee also mentioned that Fabian attended her sixteenth birthday party and told the press he wanted her to co-star in a movie with him. However, the film never materialized.

Lee then met Charles Ronald "Ronnie" Shacklett in November 1962 at a Bo Diddley and Jackie Wilson concert hosted at Nashville's Fairgrounds Coliseum. Spotting him nearby, she passed him a note that read, "Hi, my name’s Brenda, here's my number. But I'm going to be gone for three months in Europe, working." When she returned, she went on her first "single date" with him and according to Lee, it was "love at first sight". Due to her mother and manager's disapproval of Lee dating, the couple secretly became engaged in late 1962. Eighteen year-old Lee and nineteen year-old Shacklett were married on April 24, 1963 in a small ceremony with that only included some friends and Shacklett's family in attendance. Her family was not invited to the wedding in fear that they would disapprove. Lee and her mother later reconciled and she later reflected on the courtship, "Looking back, I know how much I hurt my mother. I will regret that the rest of my life." Although he spent the majority of his adulthood as a general contractor, Shacklett also operated as Lee's manager starting in 1979 and remained in the position through the 1990s.

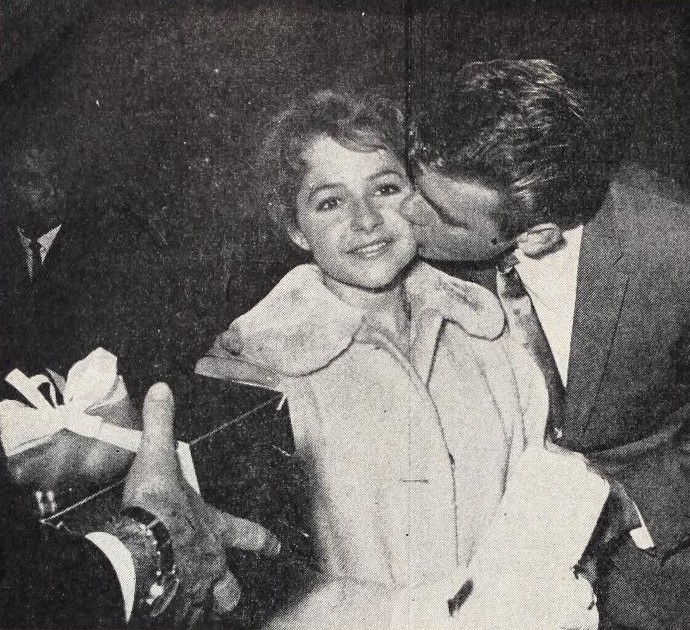
Lee went on one date with fellow teen performer, Fabian, in the 1960s. The pair is pictured above in 1961.

Lee and Shacklett have two daughters and three grandchildren. They welcomed their first daughter in 1964 named Julie,. who was named in tribute to her friend, Patsy Cline, whose own child had the same given name. At the time of her birth, Julie was found to have hyaline membrane disease and spent multiple days in critical condition. The couple sought the medical treatment of Dr. Mildred Stahlman, who had experiencing treating the son of President John F. Kennedy and she eventually made a full recovery. Under the name Julie Clay, her daughter went on to collaborate with her mother's 2002 autobiography. In 1969, Lee and Shacklett welcomed their second child, Jolie Shacklett. A grandson, Charley, was raised by Lee and Shacklett during his teenage years. Lee is also the cousin-by-marriage (by way of her mother's second marriage) to singer Dave Rainwater from the New Christy Minstrels.

=== Health ===
According to Lee, the constant pace of touring and performing during her teens took a toll on her health in early adulthood. In 1970, she spent time in a Nashville, Tennessee hospital recuperating after suffering from "exhaustion". She then had seven operations performed over the next several years for various ailments. This included a bout of severe abdominal pain in 1972 and she recalled having exploratory surgery to discover its root cause. However, the abdominal pain continued, which led to another surgery to be treated for "abdominal adhesions". In 1974, she was driving to a meeting with Owen Bradley when she began experiencing severe leg pain. At a Tennessee hospital, Lee was diagnosed with a blood clot that started spreading throughout her body. She was then given emergency surgery and eventually made a full recovery.

=== Legal battles ===
In the mid-1950s, Lee brought in an annual income of $36,000, but according to her, the money could not be accessed by her mother because Tennessee state law protected child entertainers. The family went before a court judge and appointed a legal guardian named Charlie Mosley (a friend of Albritten's). The judge granted her family a $75 allowance while the remaining amount went into a trust fund that Lee could not access until age 21. In addition, her stepfather abandoned the family in 1959, forcing them to live in a trailer park. Lee and Mosley returned to court so she could buy her family a home, which a Tennessee judge agreed to. From there, her family purchased a home located in the Haileywood Estates neighborhood outside of Nashville.

In the early-1960s, Lee's mother battled with Decca executives over a one million-dollar contract dispute. Her mother wanted her daughter's money to be put in escrow until age 21 to protect Lee from misusing the money until she was fully an adult. "We had traveled and worked too hard for anything to happen to that money. I was trying to protect her," her mother recounted in Lee's autobiography. In 1963, Billboard reported that Lee and her family eventually agreed to a 20-year court-approved contract with Decca where she would receive $35,000 per year. Battles over income continued for Lee into adulthood. After the death of Dub Albritten, Lee claimed that he was supposed to leave her money, but the money was never found and she only had $40,000 in her personal accounts. Albritten's estate lawyers also believed she owed $250,000 from her Decca contract. In her autobiography, Lee considered taking his estate to court but ultimately agreed to pay $20,000 over five years.

In 1988, Lee sued MCA Records for $20 million due to a royalty dispute. In her autobiography, Lee claimed that her lawyers discovered "huge amounts" of money "missing from overseas sales" of her recordings. She also claimed to have not received the full payments for a contract she had originally signed in 1962. Court documents claimed that Prager & Fenton did not audit MCA for the unpaid royalties despite her requests to do so. In addition, the label was supposed to pay her $775,000 each year but failed to do so. The Bryan Times also reported that Lee was missing a total $236,000. In 1989, the lawsuit was settled by US federal judge, John Nixon, and Lee's lawyer, Aleta Arthur. According to The Spokesman-Review, Lee asked for the court documents to be kept "sealed and confidential".

== Artistry ==
=== Musical styles ===
Lee's music has been categorized in the fields of rock and roll, rockabilly, pop, country and gospel. Her earliest recordings were often identified with rockabilly and early rock and roll for their driving beat and energetic tempos. "Her first few Decca singles, in fact, make a pretty fair bid for the best preteen rock & roll performances this side of Michael Jackson," said AllMusic's Richie Unterberger. "Lee didn't just live up to her nickname 'Little Miss Dynamite,' she ignited into the music scene with her vast talent and redefined what it meant to be a rock 'n' roll star," wrote PBS's Holly Snaith. "Her big, mature voice and explosive stage presence made her a fixture on early rock & roll touring shows," wrote Mary A. Bufwack and Robert K. Oermann in their book Finding Their Voice: The History of Women in Country Music.

Owen Bradley took Lee's vocals and began cushioning it with orchestral arrangements using The Nashville A-Team session musicians that transitioned her style towards pop in the 1960s. "There was no more compelling Nashville Sound pop vocalist. Indeed, there were few singers in any era, in any field of music, who could grab you by your shirt collar and demand that you listen the way that Brenda Lee could," explained Bufwack and Oermann. Unterbeger compared Lee with counterpart (and Decca label mate), Patsy Cline, noting that her songs were "more pop than Cline's" and that her ballads exemplified a maturity that pop audiences would approve of.

Although her musical roots lied in country, her focus in the genre beginning in the 1970s set forth a new sector in her career. Unterbeger believed that Lee just copied the trend of other rock and roll performers by returning to the country field. Another Allmusic writer, Greg Adams, wrote, "Lee is an excellent ballad singer, but after years of churning out serious, often continental, adult pop, it was a breath of fresh air to hear her perform lively material with down-home accompaniment." Meanwhile, Lee herself said, "I don't really think I started doing country. I just think that the music changed so much that the music I was doing in the 1970s had become what was called country." Lee has also recorded a selection of gospel in her career. In her youth, she spent time singing in gospel music church that laid a groundwork for future recordings. "Lee’s gospel recordings hold a distinct place in her career, emphasizing the importance of her faith and early inspirations," wrote Holly Snaith.

=== Voice ===
Lee was considered a child prodigy for her ability to sing from an early age. At three years old, she could sing songs in tune after only having to hear them twice through. By age five, she could sing on-pitch and without hesitation, which helped her family realize she had unique vocal talents. When she started recording in her teens, she developed a hiccup-like vocal style that was able to growl and croon, making her seem older than she was. "Whether preteen or sweet sixteen, whenever Brenda Lee opened her mouth to sing, she was a woman," remarked Bufwack and Oermann in 2003. In his book, The Oxford Handbook of Country Music, Travis D. Stimeling explained how her vocal maturity made her stand out during her peak years: "Unlike the popular women singers of the 1950s, who projected from their head voices–the proper sound of a 'girl' singer at the time–Lee sings from her chest voice and pushes against all notions of vocal decorum."

=== Influences ===
Lee's primary musical influences were Hank Williams and Mahalia Jackson. She credited Jackson due to her appreciation for gospel music and her memories of singing it in church. Lee recalled that her earliest memories were of her mother singing Hank Williams gospel songs, which inspired her to perform his songs on her first television appearances. Lee also credited Judy Garland as an influence on her music and career. She got a chance to meet Garland in the 1950s when they were both performing at the Sahara Hotel in Las Vegas. Lee approached Garland one afternoon while she was sitting beside the hotel pool. She recalled that Garland was friendly to her and gave her advice on her career. "You know, we have a lot in common. I started as a child entertainer too. Whatever you do, be a child. Don't let them take that away from you," Lee remembered Garland telling her.

== Legacy, influence and awards ==
Unlike many singers of her era, Lee had a musical versatility that crossed genre lines between country, pop, rock and gospel. Her Nashville recordings with Owen Bradley also set a trend for how crossover music took shape in years to come. Holly Snaith of PBS wrote, "Throughout her extraordinary career, Brenda Lee has transcended genre boundaries and solidified her place as one of the most versatile female artists of the 20th century." Don Roy of the Country Music Hall of Fame and Museum similarly said, "Brenda Lee has fashioned a career of uncommon durability that spans more than sixty years and transcended the musical boundaries of pop and country music." Richie Unterberger of AllMusic wrote, "More crucially, the credit for achieving success with pop-country crossovers usually goes to Patsy Cline, although Lee's efforts in this era were arguably of equal importance."

Lee was also considered an early founder of rock and roll and one of its first female singers. "With a voice that could rival artists twice her age, Lee was one of the few women to thrive in a male-dominated genre," remarked Holly Snaith. "An important pioneer of early rock and roll, she achieved unprecedented international popularity during the 1960s," said Bred Cahoon of the New Georgia Encyclopedia. Her recordings also helped prove that women could sell rock records at an equal level with their male counterparts.

Lee has been an influence on other music artists in various genres. "When I first heard Brenda Lee I thought, 'How can this be coming out of this person?' I just always think of her going 'Dynamite!' with that little growly thing she does all the time. Just unbelievable," said Pat Benatar when discussing Lee's influence. At 18 years old, Taylor Swift wrote an essay about how Lee influenced her, which was published in the book, Woman Walk the Line. "Brenda Lee is someone I always will look up to because of the way she shines. As Johnny Cash said in 1983, 'it’s almost like she’s golden'," Swift said. John Lennon once described Lee as "The greatest rock'n'roll voice of them all". Trisha Yearwood also spoke of Lee as influential artist. "She’s our history, she is to be revered and remembered. What this woman has done in her career is astonishing and she’s a true legend and hero," she said. Other artists who have cited her as an influence include Elton John, Dolly Parton and Keith Urban.

On September 26, 1986, Lee was installed in the Atlanta Music Hall of Fame 5th Annual Awards Ceremony held at the Radisson Inn, Atlanta. She was named among many other recording artists, including Riley Puckett, Gid Tanner, Dan Hornsby, Clayton McMichen, and Boots Woodall. Lee reached the final ballot for induction into the Rock and Roll Hall of Fame in 1990 and 2001 without success, but was finally voted into the Hall of Fame in 2002. Celebrating over 50 years as a recording artist, in September 2006, she was the second recipient of the Jo Meador-Walker Lifetime Achievement award by the Source Foundation in Nashville.

In 1997, she was inducted into the Country Music Hall of Fame and is a member of the Rockabilly Hall of Fame and the Hit Parade Hall of Fame. In February 2009, the National Academy of Recording Arts and Sciences gave Lee a Lifetime Achievement Grammy Award.

In 2023, Rolling Stone ranked Lee 161st on its list of the 200 Greatest Singers of All Time. Billboard ranked her 93rd on its 2025 "Top 100 Women Artists of the 21st Century" list. In December 2024, Lee was honored at the Tennessee State Capitol, where the song was named the Official Holiday Song of Tennessee. Legislation recognizing the song in this way was filed by Tennessee House of Representatives member Jason Powell in December 2023. It passed the state legislature and was signed into law by Governor Bill Lee.

== Discography ==
Studio albums

- Grandma, What Great Songs You Sang! (1959)
- Brenda Lee (1960)
- This Is...Brenda (1960)
- Emotions (1961)
- All the Way (1961)
- Sincerely (1962)
- Brenda, That's All (1962)
- All Alone Am I (1963)
- ..."Let Me Sing" (1963)
- By Request (1964)
- Merry Christmas from Brenda Lee (1964)
- Brenda Lee Sings Top Teen Hits (1965)
- The Versatile Brenda Lee (1965)
- Too Many Rivers (1965)
- One Rainy Night in Tokyo (1965)
- Bye Bye Blues (1966)
- Coming on Strong (1966)
- Reflections in Blue (1967)
- For the First Time (with Pete Fountain) (1968)
- Johnny One Time (1969)
- Memphis Portrait (1970)
- Brenda (1973)
- New Sunrise (1973)
- Brenda Lee Now (1974)
- Sincerely, Brenda Lee (1975)
- L. A. Sessions (1976)
- Just for You Something Nice (1977)
- Even Better (1980)
- Take Me Back (1980)
- Only When I Laugh (1981)
- Feels So Right (1985)
- Brenda Lee (1991)
- A Brenda Lee Christmas: In the New Old Fashioned Way (1991)
- 21 All-Time Greatest Hits (re-recordings) (1996)
- Precious Memories (1997)
- Gospel Duets with Treasured Friends (2007)

== Bibliography ==
- Lee, Brenda; Oermann, Robert K.; Clay, Julie (2002). Little Miss Dynamite: the life and times of Brenda Lee. Hyperion. ISBN 9780786866441.
- Bufwack, Mary A.; Oermann, Robert K. (2003). Finding Her Voice Women in Country Music, 1800-2000. Country Music Foundation Press.
