= Find Yourself Another Puppet =

Single by Brenda Lee
- B-side: "What I Had with You"
- Released: January 1976
- Genre: Country
- Length: 2:37
- Label: MCA
- Songwriter(s): Jimbeau Hinson

Brenda Lee singles chronology
"Bringing It Back" (1975)	"Find Yourself Another Puppet" (1976)	"Brother Shelton" (1976)

"Find Yourself Another Puppet" is a song written by Jimbeau Hinson that was originally recorded by American singer, Brenda Lee. It was released as a single by MCA Records in 1976, reaching the top 40 of the US and Canadian country charts. It received a positive response from music publications following its release.

== Background and content ==
Brenda Lee was considered a top-selling pop recording artist during the 1960s before switching to the country field in the 1970s. During the decade, she had several top ten recordings and more that made the country charts. Among her charting songs from 1976 was "Find Yourself Another Puppet". Written by Jimbeau Hinson, the song's main character tells off her romantic partner after realizing they are not interested in having a meaningful relationship. According to Lee's autobiography, she was the first person to record one of Hinson's songs. Hinson had written a fan letter to Lee and he was then invited to meet her. In his first meeting with Lee, he played her "Find Yourself Another Puppet" and she decided to record it.

== Release, critical reception and chart performance ==
"Find Yourself Another Puppet" was released as a single in January 1976 by MCA Records and was distributed as a seven-inch vinyl record, featuring the B-side, "What I Had with You". The song received a positive reception from music magazines following its release. Cash Box commented, "It’s the kind of song that Brenda Lee is best with Uptempo and with an excellent musical arrangement, this one should see high chart action." Record World found the song's production was helpful in showing Lee's vocal and the song's overall message. The single spent multiple weeks on the US Billboard Hot Country Songs chart, rising to the number 38 position in early 1976. It was Lee's final top 40 entry until 1979's "Tell Me What It's Like" there. It was also her final top 40 placement on Canada's RPM Country Tracks chart, peaking at number 23.

== Track listing ==
7" vinyl single

- "Find Yourself Another Puppet" – 2:37
- "What I Had with You" – 2:47

== Charts ==
Weekly chart performance for "Find Yourself Another Puppet"
Chart (1976)	Peak position
Canada Country Tracks (RPM)	23
US Hot Country Songs (Billboard)	38
