= Speak to Me Pretty =

1962 single by Brenda Lee

Single by Brenda Lee

from the album All the Way
- B-side: "Lover, Come Back to Me"
- Released: March 1962
- Genre: Pop
- Length: 2:14
- Label: Brunswick 05867
- Songwriters: "By" Dunham, Henry Vars

Brenda Lee singles chronology
"Break It to Me Gently" (1962)	"Speak to Me Pretty" (1962)	"Everybody Loves Me But You" / "Here Comes That Feeling" (1962)

Audio
- "Speak to Me Pretty" on YouTube

"Speak to Me Pretty" is a song written by "By" Dunham and Henry Vars and performed by Brenda Lee. The song featured on Lee's 1961 album, All the Way. Not chosen to be a single in the United States, the song was selected by Lee's U.K. record label as a single and reached number three in the U.K. singles chart in May 1962, which made it the highest-placing chart single Lee ever had in the U.K. The single also made number 57 on the overall U.K. sales chart for 1962. "Speak to Me Pretty" reached number eight in the Norwegian charts in 1962.

== Other versions ==
- Bobby Stevens released a version in 1962 as the B-side to the single "Never Goodbye".
- Victor Silvester and His Ballroom Orchestra released a version as a single in 1962 as the B-side to the single "When My Little Girl Is Smiling".
- Lena Zavaroni released a version on her 1977 album, Presenting Lena Zavaroni.

== In media ==
- Lee's version was featured in the 1961 film, The Two Little Bears.
