= Gospel Duets with Treasured Friends =

Album by Brenda Lee

Studio album by Brenda Lee
- Released: April 10, 2007
- Genre: Gospel
- Length: 32:44
- Labels: Provident Music; Sony

Brenda Lee chronology
Precious Moments (1997)	Gospel Duets with Treasured Friends (2007)

Gospel Duets with Treasured Friends is the thirty-fifth studio album by American singer Brenda Lee, released on April 10, 2007 through Provident Music. It features several duets of Brenda Lee with other known artists.

== Development ==
Brenda Lee, who was born in Atlanta, Georgia, thought about recording a Gospel album, since she "grew up in the church and gospel music." According to her, Gospel music is her "heritage" and "roots in music". All of the songs chosen for the album are songs she grew up with. As she started recording, she decided to invite some artist friends to sing with her. Provident Music liked the idea and they decided to do it.

According to Brenda Lee, all the friends she called agreed to appear on the album, which made her feel "very blessed and very fortunate. It just all came together perfectly."

== Track listing ==
No.	Title	Featuring	Length
1.	"This Old House"	Dolly Parton	1:44
2.	"Have a Little Talk with Jesus"	George Jones	2:11
3.	"In The Garden"	Alison Krauss	3:16
4.	"I Saw the Light"	Vince Gill	2:13
5.	"Jesus Loves Me"	Emmylou Harris	2:32
6.	"Precious Memories"	Pam Tillis	4:12
7.	"Swing Low, Sweet Chariot"	Kix Brooks	3:12
8.	"This Little Light of Mine"	Charlie Daniels	2:42
9.	"Uncloudy Day"	Martina McBride	2:36
10.	"Where Could I Go But to the Lord"	Ronnie Dunn	3:39
11.	"Oh! Happy Day"	Huey Lewis	4:30

== Awards ==
The album was nominated to a Dove Award for Country Album of the Year at the 39th GMA Dove Awards.

== Release history ==
Release history and formats for Gospel Duets with Treasured Friends
Region	Date	Format	Label	Ref.
North America	April 10, 2007	Compact disc	Provident Music; Sony Music Entertainment	
