= Johnny One Time =

Single by Brenda Lee

from the album Johnny One Time
- B-side: "I Must Have Been Out of My Mind"
- Released: 23 December 1968
- Recorded: 14 October 1968; Columbia 30th Street Studio; New York City, New York, U.S.
- Genre: Country
- Length: 3:14
- Label: Decca 32428
- Songwriters: A.L. "Doodle" Owens, Dallas Frazier
- Producer: Mike Berniker

Brenda Lee singles chronology
"Each Day Is a Rainbow" (1968)	"Johnny One Time" (1968)	"You Don't Need Me Anymore" (1969)

"Johnny One Time" is a song written by A.L. "Doodle" Owens and Dallas Frazier and performed by Brenda Lee. The song reached #3 on the adult contemporary chart, #41 on the Billboard Hot 100, and #50 on the country chart in 1969. The song also reached #11 on the Canadian adult contemporary chart and #38 on the Canadian pop chart. It was featured on her 1969 album, Johnny One Time.

The song was produced by Mike Berniker and arranged by Marty Manning. Lee was nominated for the Grammy Award for Best Female Pop Vocal Performance for the song.

== Personnel ==
Adapted from the liner notes of Brenda Lee Anthology 1956-1980.

- Recorded October 14, 1968, Columbia Studios, New York
- Jay Berliner – Guitar
- Arthur Brennan – Piano
- Louis Mauro – Bass
- Buddy Saltzman – Drums
- Dave Carey – Vibes
- Mike Berniker – Producer
- Marty Manning – Arranger/Conductor

== Chart history ==
Willie Nelson version

Chart (1968)	Peak position
U.S. Billboard Country	36

Brenda Lee version

Chart (1968–69)	Peak position
Canada RPM Adult Contemporary	11
Canada RPM Top Singles	38
US Billboard Hot 100	41
US Billboard Adult Contemporary	3
US Billboard Country	50
US Cash Box Top 100	34

== Other versions ==
- Willie Nelson released a version of the song as a single in 1968 that reached #36 on the country chart.
- Hootenanny Singers released a version of the song entitled "Casanova" in 1969 as the B-side to "Om Jag Kunde Skriva En Visa". The Swedish translation of the song was by Stig Anderson.
- Loretta Lynn released a version of the song on her 1969 album, Woman of the World/To Make a Man.
- Johnny Duncan (country singer) released a version of the song on his 1969 album of the same name.
- Maxine Weldon released a version of the song for her 1970 album Right On.
