= Dum Dum (song) =

1961 song by Brenda Lee

- Danish release picture sleeve

Single by Brenda Lee

from the album All the Way
- B-side: "Eventually"
- Released: June 26, 1961
- Recorded: May 21, 1961
- Studio: Bradley Studios (Nashville, Tennessee)
- Genre: Pop; novelty
- Length: 2:27
- Label: Decca 31272
- Songwriters: Jackie DeShannon, Sharon Sheeley
- Producer: Owen Bradley

Brenda Lee singles chronology
"You Can Depend on Me" (1961)	"Dum Dum" (1961)	"Fool #1" (1961)

"Dum Dum" is a song written by Jackie DeShannon and Sharon Sheeley and performed by Brenda Lee. The song reached #4 on the Billboard Hot 100, #4 in Australia, and #22 in the UK in 1961. It was featured on her 1961 album, All the Way.

The song was produced by Owen Bradley. The singles B-side, "Eventually", reached #56 on the Billboard Hot 100.

The song was ranked #91 on Billboard magazine's Top Hot 100 songs of 1961.
