= One Step at a Time (Brenda Lee song) =

Single by Brenda Lee
- B-side: "Fairyland"
- Released: 28 January 1957
- Recorded: 3 January 1957
- Studio: Pythian Temple, New York City
- Genre: Country
- Length: 2:38
- Label: Decca Records 30198
- Songwriter(s): Hugh Ashley

Brenda Lee singles chronology
"Jambalaya (On the Bayou)" (1956)	"One Step at a Time" (1957)	"Dynamite" (1957)

"One Step at a Time" is a song written by Hugh Ashley and performed by Brenda Lee. The song reached number 15 on the country chart and number 43 on the Billboard Hot 100 in 1957.

The song was arranged by Jack Pleis. Session personnel on the recording included Al Caiola and Edward O'Conner on guitar, Sanford Block on bass, Sam Taylor on saxophone, Andrew Ackers on piano, Nick Tagg on organ, Jimmy Crawford on drums, and the Ray Charles Singers on backing vocals.
