= Johnny One Time (album) =

Studio album by Brenda Lee
- Released: May 19, 1969
- Recorded: October 1968–March 1969
- Studios: Columbia 30th Street Studio, and Pythian Temple
- Genres: Adult contemporary; pop
- Label: Decca
- Producer: Mike Berniker

Brenda Lee chronology
For the First Time (1968)	Johnny One Time (1969)	Memphis Portrait (1970)

Singles from Johnny One Time
- 1. "Johnny One Time" Released: December 1968

Johnny One Time is the twentieth studio album by American singer Brenda Lee. It was released on May 19, 1969, by Decca Records and was her twentieth studio album. A total of 11 tracks comprised the album, many of which were covers. The title track was a charting single in the US and Canada in 1969. The album was met with positive reviews from critics after its release.

== Background, recording and content ==
Brenda Lee had been a recording artist since age 11 and had her greatest commercial success during the early 1960s. A majority of her singles from this era made the top ten including "I'm Sorry", "Fool No. 1" and "All Alone Am I". As the decade progressed, Lee's chart run declined but she continued recording for her label Decca Records. One of her singles from the later decade was "Johnny One Time", which had first been a single for Willie Nelson. It made chart positions in multiple formats, including the country genre. The song inspired Lee's 1969 album of the same name.

Johnny One Time represented a change in recording practices for Lee. After recording almost exclusively for producer Owen Bradley in Nashville, this album was recorded in New York for producer Mike Berniker. The recording sessions were held between October 1968 and March 1969, mostly at the Columbia 30th Street Studio, with two tracks done at the Pythian Temple. The album consisted of 11 tracks. Similar to many of Lee's albums from the era, the collection featured mostly covers of pop recordings. This included "If You Go Away", "The Letter" and several more.

== Release, reception and chart performance ==
Professional ratings
Review scores
Source	Rating
Allmusic	3/5 stars

Johnny One Time was released by Decca Records on May 19, 1969. It was Lee's twentieth studio album in her career. The album was distributed as a vinyl LP, featuring five tracks on side one and six tracks on side two. The album was met with positive reviews from critics following its release. Cashbox magazine found that Lee performed the album's songs with "equal style and ease". They concluded by predicting that it would "good play on middle-of-the-road stations". Greg Adams of AllMusic gave Johnny One Time three out of five stars. Adams found the album to have a pop style and concluded, "Brenda Lee is a sadly underrated vocalist who could have gone in any direction she chose; on Johnny One Time she dabbles in various styles, but the prevailing mood is one of adult pop."

Johnny One Time made the US Billboard 200 record chart in 1969, reaching the number 98 position. It was Lee's final album to reach the top 100 on the record chart. The album's only single was the title track, which was issued by Decca Records in December 1968. The single reached number 41 on the US Hot 100, number three on the US adult contemporary chart and number 50 on the US country songs chart. It also reached number 38 on the Canadian RPM Top Singles Chart.

== Track listing ==
Side one
No.	Title	Writer(s)	Length
1.	"Johnny One Time"	A.L. "Doodle" Owens; Dallas Frazier	3:14
2.	"Traces"	Buddy Buie; J. R. Cobb; Emory Gordy Jr.	2:46
3.	"If You Go Away"	Jacques Brel; Rod McKuen	4:44
4.	"Bring Me Sunshine"	Arthur Kent; Sylvia Dee	2:21
5.	"Help Yourself (Gli Occhi Miei)"	Carlo Donida; Jack Fishman	3:40

Side two
No.	Title	Writer(s)	Length
1.	"Let It Be Me (Je T'Appartiens)"	Gilbert Bécaud; Manny Curtis; Pierre Delanoë	2:06
2.	"For Once in My Life"	Ron Miller; Orlando Murden	2:01
3.	"This Girl's in Love with You"	Burt Bacharach; Hal David	3:39
4.	"Matelot"	Noël Coward	3:22
5.	"The Letter"	Wayne Carson	2:01
6.	"Walk Away (Warum Nur, Warum)"	Udo Jürgens; Don Black	4:07

== Personnel ==
All credits are adapted from the liner notes of Johnny One Time.

- Mark Berniker – Producer
- Hal Buksbaum – Cover photo
- Marty Manning – Conducting

== Chart performance ==
Chart (1969)	Peak position
US Billboard 200	98

== Release history ==
Region	Date	Format	Label	Ref.
Brazil	May 19, 1969	Vinyl LP	Decca Records	
North America	May 19, 1969	Vinyl LP	Decca Records	
Venezuela	May 19, 1969	Vinyl LP	Orbe	
United Kingdom	1970	Vinyl LP	MCA Records	
Various	Circa 2026	Music download; streaming	MCA Nashville	
