= Feels So Right (Brenda Lee album) =

Studio album by Brenda Lee
- Released: August 1985
- Studio: Emerald Studios
- Genre: Country
- Label: MCA
- Producers: Emory Gordy Jr.; David Hungate

Brenda Lee chronology
The Winning Hand (1982)	Feels So Right (1985)	Brenda Lee (1991)

Singles from Feels So Right
- 1. "I'm Takin' My Time" Released: July 1985; 2. "Why You Been Gone So Long" Released: December 1985; 3. "Two Hearts" Released: March 1986

Feels So Right is the thirty-first studio album by American singer, Brenda Lee. It was released by MCA Records in August 1985. The ten-track collection was Lee's final for MCA, which would drop her from their roster in 1986 in-part due to the album's lack of success, according to Lee herself. Despite this, the album received critical acclaim from Billboard, Cash Box and Saturday Review magazines. Three singles were spawned, two of which reached positions outside the US country songs top 40.

== Background ==
During the 1960s, Brenda had a string of pop hits that made her one of the best-selling music artists of the decade. She then made a successful transition into country music in the 1970s and had a continued string of hits that reached the top ten and top 40 into the mid 1980s. Most of these recordings were made for MCA Records and Feels So Right would prove to be Lee's final for the label. In 1984, Jimmy Bowen became the new President of MCA and was known for his "aggressive" approach to record production. According to Lee, Bowen rejected a studio album she made with producer Jerry Crutchfield. Worried about Bowen dropping her from MCA, Lee searched for a new producer. She then performed at songwriter's birthday and was introduced to Emory Gordy Jr., who was interested in working with her. According to Lee, Bowen was enthusiastic about Gordy serving as Lee's producer and they began making her next album.

== Recording and content ==
Feels So Right was recorded at Emerald Studios in Nashville, Tennessee with Emory Gordy Jr. and David Hungate serving as co-producers. The project consisted of ten tracks. The recordings were cut in an uptempo style featuring session musicians from different fields, including Larrie Londin (Elvis Presley's drummer), Richard Bennett (Neil Diamond's band leader) and Nicolette Larson (a recording artist of the era). In Lee's book, an MCA employee recounted that Lee performed all the vocals live in the studio and with "perfect pitch". Of its tracks, two were written by Mickey Newbury: "That Was the Way It Was Then" and "Why You Been Gone So Long".

== Release and critical reception ==
Feels So Right was released by MCA Records in August 1985 and was her thirty first studio album. The label offered it in two formats: a vinyl LP or a cassette. Upon its release, it received a positive critical response. Billboard found the album had a modern sound that proved Lee still was a relevant performer. "This package proves there's nothing dated in this lady's approach," they concluded. Cash Box similarly wrote, "Lee’s voice is still one of the most powerful in the business, and the songs on this album will give her plenty of excellent choices for singles and for new additions to her already hit-laden stage show." Saturday Review found the album had a lot of "careful preparation" that resulted in "amazing staying power" for Lee's music.

== Singles and promotion ==
Three singles resulted from the album, beginning with "I'm Takin' My Time" (released by MCA in July 1985). Debuting on the US Hot Country Songs chart in August 1985, it spent nine weeks there and rose to the number 54 position. The second single was issued in December 1985: "Why You Been Gone So Long". Billboard described the tune as a "rockabilly revamping" of Newbury's original composition. Making its debut on the US Hot Country Songs chart on December 21, 1985, it spent 12 weeks there and peaked at the number 50 position on April 19, 1986. It would be among Lee's final charting US country singles in her career. Its third single was "Two Hearts" (issued in March 1986). Lee claimed that because the album was not a success, Bowen ultimately dropped her from MCA in 1986, along with several other veteran artists on the label like Barbara Mandrell and Don Williams. Lee also claimed that despite MCA investing a large sum of money into the making of Feels So Right, it was not given proper promotion.

== Track listing ==
Side one
No.	Title	Writer(s)	Length
1.	"Roll Back the Rug"	J. Jarvis; G. Nicholson; Don Cook	3:11
2.	"How Sweet It Is (To Be Loved by You)"	Holland–Dozier–Holland	3:17
3.	"It'll Be Me"	M. Garvin; T. Shapiro; C. Waters	3:04
4.	"He Can't Make Your Kind of Love"	T. Skinner; J. L. Wallace	3:07
5.	"That Was the Way It Was Then"	M. Newbury	3:43

Side two
No.	Title	Writer(s)	Length
1.	"Why You Been Gone So Long"	M. Newbury	2:47
2.	"Two Hearts"	J. Leo; R. Larose	3:34
3.	"I'm Takin' My Time"	P. Alger; R. Beresford	2:41
4.	"Loving Arms"	T. Jans	3:04
5.	"Feels So Right"	P. Kennerley	4:48

== Personnel ==
All credits are adapted from the liner notes of Feels So Right.

Musical personnel

- Richard Bennett – Acoustic guitar, electric guitar
- Sonny Garrish – Steel guitar
- Emory Gordy Jr. – Bass
- Carl Gorozetdky – Concert master
- David Hungate – Bass
- John Jarvis – Acoustic
- Shane Keister – Keyboards
- Nicolette Larson – Background vocals
- Larrie Londin – Drums
- Nashville String Machine – Strings
- Dean Parks – Acoustic guitar, electric guitar, saxophone
- Jim Photoglo – Background vocals
- Lisa Silver – Background vocals
- Diane Tidwell – Background vocals
- Billy Joe Walker Jr. – Electric guitar
- Reggie Young – Electric guitar, six-string bass guitar

Technical personnel

- Chuck Ainlay – Mixing
- Bob Bullock – Recorder
- Mark Coddington – Sound engineer
- Norma Gerson – Makeup
- Emory Gordy Jr. – Producer, string arrangements
- Kathy Heart – Copyist
- David Hingate – Producer, string arrangements
- JVC Digital Audio Mastering – Mastering
- Shane Keister – String arrangements
- Tim Kish – Sound engineer
- Simon Levy – Art direction
- Russ Martin – Sound engineer
- Glen Meadows – Mastering
- Helen Owen – Hair
- Thomas Ryan – Design

== Release history ==
Release history and formats for Feels So Right
Region	Date	Format	Label	Ref.
Various	August 1985	Vinyl LP; cassette	MCA Records	
