= L. A. Sessions =

Studio album by Brenda Lee
- Released: December 1976
- Genre: Pop
- Label: MCA
- Producer: Snuff Garrett

Brenda Lee chronology
Sincerely, Brenda Lee (1975)	L. A. Sessions (1976)	Even Better (1980)

Singles from L. A. Sessions
- 1. "Takin' What I Can Get" Released: October 1976; 2. "Ruby's Lounge" Released: February 1977

L. A. Sessions is the twenty-sixth studio album by American singer, Brenda Lee. It was released in December 1976 by MCA Records and consisted of 11 tracks. The material was targeted towards a pop audience after Lee spent several years being marketed as a country artist. Lee worked with a new producer for the project and recorded it in Los Angeles (hence the album's title). However, it proved to not be commercially successful, producing two low-charting US singles between 1976 and 1977.

== Background ==
Brenda Lee had been one of the best-selling music artists of the 1960s, with a string of pop top ten hits. In the 1970s, she was reinvented as a country music artist and had several more top ten songs in the genre. A majority of Lee's recordings up to that point were produced by her longtime collaborator, Owen Bradley. However, Bradley retired from the music industry in the mid 1970s. Lee's label encouraged her to work with California-based producer, Snuff Garrett, who was suggested due to his success with Cher. Lee agreed to the album project, which would later be titled L. A. Sessions.

== Recording and content ==
Lee traveled to Los Angeles and recorded L. A. Sessions at Larrabee Sound Studios alongside Garrett. In her autobiography, Lee remembered missing recording in Nashville, Tennessee and that she went to Los Angeles "reluctantly" to make the project. She also recalled disliking the recording process as compared to Nashville-produced albums, citing the overdubbing of her vocals as something that "drove me crazy". Lee also claimed that she had no input with song selection because all of the material was chosen ahead of time. L. A. Session consisted of 11 tracks in total. The songs chosen for the track listing were described as "pop" in comparison to her previous country-themed projects. Included was Lieber & Stoller's "Saved" and J. Cunningham's "Takin' What I Can Get", which was described by Cash Box as a cheating song.

== Release, reception, chart performance and singles ==
L. A. Sessions was released by MCA Records in December 1976 and was offered in two formats: a vinyl LP or a 8-track cartridge. It received a positive response from Billboard who named it one of its "Recommended LP's". "Lee provides a commendable array of pop oriented tunes, all with uptempo arrangements," they wrote. It became Lee's fifth album to make the US Billboard Top Country Albums chart. Entering the chart on December 11, 1976, it spent five weeks there and rose to the number 41 position on December 18. Two singles were included on the project, its earliest being "Takin' What I Can Get" (released by MCA in October 1976). It reached number 41 on the US Hot Country Songs chart, becoming her first single since 1972 to peak outside the top 40. The album's second single was released in February 1977 titled "Ruby's Lounge". It only reached number 78 on the US country chart, becoming Lee's lowest-performing release on the country chart up to that point.

== Track listing ==
Side one
No.	Title	Writer(s)	Length
1.	"Oklahoma Superstar"	John Durrill	3:06
2.	"Takin' What I Can Get"	J. C. Cunningham	2:53
3.	"I Let You Let Me Down Again"	Ed Welch	3:16
4.	"Ruby's Lounge"	Stephen H. Doriff; Milton L. Brown	3:15
5.	"When Our Love Began (Cowboys and Indians)"	Bud Reneau; Mark Sherrill	2:49
6.	"Mary's Going Out of Her Mind"	John Durrill	3:27

Side two
No.	Title	Writer(s)	Length
1.	"Your Favorite Wornout Nightmare's Coming Home"	Sandy Pinkard; Stephen H. Dorff	2:51
2.	"One More Time"	Jerry Styner; Porter Jordan	2:51
3.	"Saved"	Jerry Lieber; Mike Stoller	2:41
4.	"The Lumberjacks Had a Lady"	Denice and Christopher Crockett	2:24
5.	"It's Another Weekend"	John Durrill	3:18

== Technical personnel ==
All credits are adapted from the liner notes of L. A. Sessions.

- Al Capps – Arrangement
- Steve Dorff – Arranger, conductor
- David Gahr – Photography
- Snuff Garrett – Producer
- Lenny Roberts – Engineer
- Richard Seireeni – Design
- Randy Tominaga – Assistant engineer

== Chart performance ==
Chart (1976–1977)	Peak position
US Top Country Albums (Billboard)	41

== Release history ==
Release history and formats for L. A. Sessions
Region	Date	Format	Label	Ref.
Various	December 1976	Vinyl LP; 8-track cartridge	MCA Records	
Various	Circa 2026	Music download; streaming	MCA Nashville	
