= Brenda (album) =

Studio album by Brenda Lee
- Released: March 1973
- Studio: Bradley's Barn
- Genre: Country; Countrypolitan; pop
- Label: MCA
- Producer: Owen Bradley

Brenda Lee chronology
Memphis Portrait (1970)	Brenda (1973)	New Sunrise (1973)

Singles from Brenda
- 1. "Always on My Mind" Released: June 1972; 2. "Nobody Wins" Released: January 1973

Brenda is the twenty-second studio album by American singer Brenda Lee, released in March 1973 by MCA Records. The project reunited her with producer Owen Bradley, who recorded her first top-ten US country single called "Nobody Wins". The song established Lee in the country music market, where she would have several top-ten singles. Brenda was met with a mostly positive critical reception and reached the top ten of the US country album charts.

== Background ==
Brenda Lee was among the top-selling pop music artists of the 1960s, recording a series of singles under the production of Owen Bradley. Songs like "I'm Sorry", "Emotions" and "Break It to Me Gently" reached the US top ten. Lee began experimenting with different record producers in the late 1960s and early 1970s, but found little success with new styles. According to Lee, she approached her record label and insisted working again with Bradley, and the label agreed. Lee reunited with Bradley beginning in 1971 with songs that made brief US chart appearances. She was then given with the Kris Kristofferson-penned, "Nobody Wins" which became a US top ten country single. Lee would go on to have six more top ten US country singles during the decade and she became identified with the country market. "Nobody Wins" would then appear on her next studio project in 1973.

== Recording and content ==
Brenda was recorded at Owen Bradley's studio, Bradley's Barn, located in Mount Juliet, Tennessee. The album contained a total of 11 tracks. Several cover tunes were included as part of the project including "I Can See Clearly Now", "Sweet Memories" and "Run to Me". New recordings were also part of the project, including Johnny Christopher's "Always on My Mind". The song became a greater commercial success for Willie Nelson. Many of the album's tracks were ballads recorded in a pop style in an effort to bring back Lee's fans of her 1960s music. Among examples of songs recorded in a ballad format was "Here I Am Again".

== Critical reception ==
Professional ratings
Review scores
Source	Rating
AllMusic	2/5 stars

Brenda was given a positive critical response following its release. Billboard magazine named the album among its "Pick LP's" in March 1973, highlighting its use of ballads and Lee's vocal delivery. "This is broad, round sounding music capitalising on her ballad skills and her penchant for finding songs with punch. Brenda remains as smooth as silk," they concluded. The publication also highlighted four tracks as the project's "best cuts", including "Run to Me" and "I'm a Memory". Cash Box magazine believed the album was bringing Lee's music back "on the right track again" with country-infused recordings. They also wrote, "Little Miss Dynamite strikes again with this superlative country collection that should interest many others beyond the realm of country music." It was given a two-star rating AllMusic as well.

== Release, chart performance and singles ==
Brenda was released by MCA Records in March 1973 and was the twenty second studio album of her career. It was also the first album issued by MCA. The album was offered as either a vinyl LP or an 8-track cartridge. Brenda was the first of Lee's albums to reach the US Top Country Albums chart. Debuting on the survey on April 17, 1973, the album spent 17 weeks there, rising to the number seven position on June 9. It was one of four albums by Lee to make the US country albums top ten in her career and the first of 11 to reach the chart altogether. In addition, Brenda reached a position outside the US Billboard 200 all-genre survey, climbing to number 206 in 1973. Two singles were included on the project. The first was Lee's version of "Always on My Mind", which was issued in June 1972. The song only rose to the number 45 position on the US Hot Country Songs chart in 1972. Its most successful single was "Nobody Wins", which was issued in January 1973. The song became her first US top ten single on the Country Songs chart, rising to number five in 1973. It also made the US Hot 100, peaking at number 70. It also went to the number one position on Canada's RPM Country Tracks chart around the same period.

== Track listing ==
Side one
No.	Title	Writer(s)	Length
1.	"Nobody Wins"	Kris Kristofferson	2:57
2.	"I Can See Clearly Now"	Johnny Nash	2:47
3.	"Sweet Memories"	Mickey Newbury	3:27
4.	"Everybody's Reaching Out for Someone"	Dickey Lee; Allen Reynolds	2:11
5.	"Here I Am Again"	Shel Silverstein	3:00
6.	"Run to Me"	Barry Gibb; Robin Gibb; Maurice Gibb	2:44

Side two
No.	Title	Writer(s)	Length
1.	"Something's Wrong with Me"	Danny Janssen; Bobby Hart	2:45
2.	"I'm a Memory"	Willie Nelson	2:53
3.	"My Sweet Baby"	John Denver	2:50
4.	"We Had a Good Thing Going"	Eddie Polo	2:32
5.	"Always on My Mind"	Wayne Carson; Mark James; Johnny Christopher	2:50

== Chart performance ==
Chart (1973)	Peak position
US Billboard 200	206
US Top Country Albums (Billboard)	7

== Release history ==
Release history and formats for Brenda
Region	Date	Format	Label	Ref.
Various	March 1973	Vinyl LP (stereo); 8-track cartridge	MCA Records	
Various	Circa 2026	Music download; streaming	MCA Nashville	
