= All the Way (Brenda Lee album) =

1961 album by Brenda Lee

Studio album by Brenda Lee
- Released: August 7, 1961
- Genres: Pop; rock and roll
- Label: Decca
- Producer: Owen Bradley

Brenda Lee chronology
Emotions (1961)	All the Way (1961)	Sincerely (1962)

Singles from All the Way
- 1. "Dum Dum"/"Eventually" Released: June 1961; 2. "Speak to Me Pretty" Released: March 1962

All the Way is the fifth studio album by American singer, Brenda Lee. It was released on August 7, 1961 by Decca Records and was her fifth studio album. The 12-track collection featured a mixture of pop and rock selections. Among them were the top five US-UK singles "Dum Dum" and "Speak to Me Pretty". The album made the US and UK top-20 album surveys after its release. All the Way received a mixed critical reception from critics and publications.

== Background, recording and content ==
Brenda Lee was one of the top-selling music artists of the 1960s with a string of top-10 singles during the decade. A series of albums were released by Lee's label, Decca, in this period that featured her major hits. Among her early 1960s LP's was All the Way. The album's production was credited to Owen Bradley and consisted of 12 tracks. All the Way combined a mixture of pop and rock songs, featuring a series of pop ballads and uptempo rock songs. Among them were cover versions of hits from the era such as "Kansas City", "On the Sunny Side of the Street" and Ray Charles's "Talkin' About You". The album's liner notes further described its mixture of material: "Here is Brenda in an album that beautifully spans the remarkable scope of her unusual talent and versatility."

== Critical reception ==
Professional ratings
Review scores
Source	Rating
Allmusic	3.5/5 stars

All the Way received mixed reviews from writers and publications following its release. Billboard praised the product, writing, "The swingin', 16-year-old thrush pounds out a flock of terrific efforts here." Cash Box complimented the album's familiarity and also believed the album would perform well with teen audiences. Australian newspaper, The Age, praised Lee's vocal performance, highlighting the power of her voice: "American teenage Brenda Lee can not only 'belt' or bawl a ballad with surprising power." Meanwhile, AllMusic's Richie Unterberger found that its track listing lacked quality material, which he said was a theme of many early 1960s LP's. Despite this, he also wrote, "Within its limitations, however, it was a pretty good record, and certainly very well produced and well sung." Unterberger gave the album 3.5 stars.

== Release, chart performance and singles ==
All the Way was released on August 7, 1961 by Decca Records and was distributed as a vinyl LP into formats: mono or stereo. Its release made it Lee's fifth studio album issued in her career. It also became her fourth LP to make the US Billboard 200 all-genre chart. Spending 39 weeks on the chart, it peaked at the number 17 position in 1961. It was also the first LP of her career to make the UK Albums Chart, spending two weeks there and rising to the number 20 position. Two singles were included on All the Way, its earliest being "Dum Dum" (issued by Decca in June 1961). It reached number four on the US Hot 100, number four on Australia's Kent Music Report chart list and number 22 on the UK Singles Chart. The single's B-side, "Eventually", was also part of the All the Way track listing and made the US Hot 100 as well, peaking at number 56. "Speak to Me Pretty" was released internationally in March 1962 by Brunswick Records and rose to number three on the UK Singles Chart that same year.

== Track listing ==
Side one
No.	Title	Writer(s)	Length
1.	"Lover Come Back to Me"	Sigmund Romberg; Oscar Hammerstein	2:35
2.	"All the Way"	James Van Heusen; Sammy Cahn	3:00
3.	"Dum Dum"	Sharon Sheeley; Jackie DeShannon	2:27
4.	"On the Sunny Side of the Street"	Jimmy McHugh; Dorothy Fields	3:07
5.	"Talkin' 'Bout You"	Ray Charles	2:36
6.	"Someone to Love Me (The Prisoner's Song)"	Guy Massey	2:40

Side two
No.	Title	Writer(s)	Length
1.	"Do I Worry (Yes I Do)"	Jerry Lordan	2:04
2.	"Tragedy"	Fred Burch; Gerald Nelson	2:44
3.	"Kansas City"	Mike Stoller; Jerry Leiber	2:35
4.	"Eventually"	Ronnie Self; Dub Albritten	2:54
5.	"Speak to Me Pretty" (from Two Little Bears)	Henry Vars; By Dunham	2:15
6.	"Big Chance"	Nelson; Burch	2:12

== Chart performance ==
Chart (1961)	Peak position
UK Albums (Official Charts)	20
US Billboard 200	17

== Release history ==
Release history and formats for All the Way
Region	Date	Format	Label	Ref.
Various	August 7, 1961	LP mono; LP stereo	Brunswick; Decca; Festival	
Various	1962–1963	LP mono; LP stereo	Brunswick; Decca	
Various	Circa 2013	Compact disc (CD)	Hallmark Records	
Various	Circa 2020	Music download; streaming	MCA Nashville	
