= Memphis Portrait =

Studio album by Brenda Lee
- Released: September 1970
- Studio: American Sound Studio
- Genre: Pop
- Label: Decca
- Producer: Chips Moman

Brenda Lee chronology
Johnny One Time (1969)	Memphis Portrait (1970)	Brenda (1973)

Singles from Memphis Portrait
- 1. "I Think I Love You Again" Released: April 1970; 2. "Sisters in Sorrow" Released: August 1970; 3. "Proud Mary" Released: 1971

Memphis Portrait is the twenty-first studio album by American singer, Brenda Lee. It was released in September 1970 by Decca Records and was an attempt for Lee to capitalize on the commercial success of albums recorded in Memphis, Tennessee. Overall, the album was considered a commercial failure but received positive reviews from critics and spawned three singles. Among its singles was the charting song "I Think I Love You Again".

== Background ==
Brenda Lee was considered among the most popular music artists of the 1960s and had a series of top-charting pop singles. This included "I'm Sorry", "I Want to Be Wanted", "Emotions" and "Break It to Me Gently". All of these recordings were produced by Nashville's Owen Bradley, but in 1967, Lee experimented with new record producers in various US cities. In the early 1970s, popular songs by Elvis Presley and Neil Diamond were recorded in Memphis, Tennessee and according to Lee, her record label suggested she travel to Memphis to make her next album in an effort to "capture some of the magic" occurring with the city's production style. Lee agreed to the idea and traveled there to collaborate with producer, Chips Moman.

== Recording and content ==
Lee recalled spending one week recording Memphis Portrait "around the clock" and had food catered there so they did not have to leave the studio. The album was produced entirely by Moman at the American Sound Studio in Memphis. The project utilized Memphis-based sessions musicians rather than The Nashville A-Team group she used in Nashville. Lee remembered that the Memphis musicians embraced the same "laid back attitude" and "incredible musicianship" that the A-Team had done as well. The project consisted of 11 tracks that featured many covers of popular songs from the era. Among them were two songs by Joe South: "Games People Play" and "Walk a Mile in My Shoes". Another cover included the Bee Gees's "Give a Hand, Take a Hand". Some new recordings were also part of the project, including "I Think I Love You Again".

== Release, critical reception and singles ==
Memphis Portrait was released in September 1970 by Decca Records and was the twenty first studio album of her career. It was distributed as a vinyl LP and as a 8-track cartridge. The album was met with a positive reception from music publications following its release. Billboard called it "a commercial winner" with "dynamite performances", highlighting several of the album's cover songs. RPM magazine positively wrote, "The 'Memphis Sound' sits well with this early 60's trooper". A total of three singles were spawned from the project, beginning with the April 1970 release of "I Think I Love You Again". The single peaked at the number 97 on the US Billboard Hot 100 and number 37 on the US Adult Contemporary chart. It was followed by the August 1970 release of "Sisters in Sorrow", which Cash Box called "the most teen-oriented single that she has done in years." It was followed in 1971 (unknown month) by the release of "Proud Mary". Lee later recalled in her autobiography that Memphis Portrait was considered by her label "a commercial failure" and its lack of success prompted her to return to working with Owen Bradley as her producer.

== Track listing ==
Side one
No.	Title	Writer(s)	Length
1.	"Give a Hand, Take a Hand"	Barry Gibb; Maurice Gibb	2:52
2.	"Leaving on a Jet Plane"	John Denver	3:32
3.	"So Close to Heaven"	Bobby Weinstein; Jon Stroll	2:43
4.	"Games People Play"	Joe South	2:44
5.	"I Think I Love You Again"	Toni White; Irwin Levine	2:38

Side two
No.	Title	Writer(s)	Length
1.	"Too Heavy to Carry"	Fred Mathews; Benny Mardones; Alan Miles	2:17
2.	"Walk a Mile in My Shoes"	Joe South	3:06
3.	"Hello Love"	Red Williams; Reggie Young	2:30
4.	"Proud Mary"	J. C. Fogerty	2:51
5.	"Do Right Woman, Do Right Man"	Chips Moman; Dan Penn	2:58
6.	"I'm Gonna Keep on Loving You"	Paul Davis	2:39

== Personnel ==
All credits are adapted from the liner notes of Memphis Portrait.

Musical personnel

- Gene Chrisman – Drums
- Johnny Christopher – Rhythm guitar
- Bobby Emmons – Organ
- Brenda Lee – Lead vocals
- Mike Leech – Bass
- Reggie Young – Lead guitar
- Bobby Wood – Piano

Technical personnel

- DJ – Mastering
- Chips Moman – Producer
- Glen Spreen – Arrangement (strings and horn)
- John Walsh – A&R coordinator

== Release history ==
Release history and formats for Memphis Portrait
Region	Date	Format	Label	Ref.
North America	September 1970	Vinyl LP (stereo); 8-track cartridge	Decca Records	
Australia, Brazil, United Kingdom	1971	Vinyl LP (stereo)	MCA Records	
United Kingdom	1974	Vinyl LP (stereo)	MCA Records	
