= Sincerely, Brenda Lee =

Studio album by Brenda Lee
- Released: April 1975
- Genre: Country
- Label: MCA

Brenda Lee chronology
Brenda Lee Now (1974)	Sincerely, Brenda Lee (1975)	L. A. Sessions (1976)

Singles from Sincerely, Brenda Lee
- 1. "He's My Rock" Released: March 1975; 2. "Lucky" Released: 1975; 3. "Before the Next Teardrop Falls" Released: 1976

Sincerely, Brenda Lee is the twenty-fifth studio album by American singer, Brenda Lee. It was released in April 1975 by MCA Records and was her twenty fifth studio album. The project contained ten tracks featuring three singles, notably the top ten country song, "He's My Rock". The project was met with positive reviews from both Billboard and Cash Box magazine following its release.

== Background, recording and content ==
During the 1960s, Brenda Lee was among music's most successful recording artists with a string of US top ten singles under the production of Owen Bradley. She then changed record producers at the end of the decade but had less success and ultimately returned to Bradley in the early 1970s. Now marketed as a country artist, Lee had several top ten US country singles during the decade. One of her singles from this period was "He's My Rock", which served as the lead release for the album Sincerely, Brenda Lee. The project consisted of ten tracks in total, including a cover of Bill Anderson's 1963 song, "Still". Other less-known tracks included "Papa's Knee", which described a character recalling their childhood with their father.

== Critical reception ==
Sincerely, Brenda Lee received positive reviews from music magazines following its release. Billboard put it among its "Top Album Picks" in April 1975, writing, "There is always an excitement which accompanies a Brenda Lee release, for she is an expert in every sense of the word. Everything she does is excellent, and thus the anticipation." Cash Box praised the album for showcasing Lee in a similar fashion to those that preceded her earlier work: "This super talented little lady could not do anything bad. Her material and career started off great and just keeps on getting better. This collection is a classic demonstration of the style she is so well known and loved for."

== Release, chart performance and singles ==
Sincerely, Brenda Lee was released in April 1975 by MCA Records and was the twenty fifth studio album of her career. It was offered as either a vinyl LP or a 8-track cartridge. The album made its debut on the US Billboard Top Country Albums chart on May 3, 1975 and spent three weeks there, peaking at the number 23 position on May 24. It was Lee's fourth album to make the country chart in her career. Two singles were part of the project, beginning with "He's My Rock" (first issued by MCA in March 1975). It reached number eight on the US Hot Country Songs chart and number ten on Canada's Country Tracks chart in 1975. Two promotional singles were issued, beginning with 1975's "Lucky". It was followed by 1976's "Before the Next Teardrop Falls".

== Track listing ==
Side one
No.	Title	Writer(s)	Length
1.	"He's My Rock"	S. K. Dobbins	2:20
2.	"Never Let Him Go"	David Gates	3:12
3.	"Take a Picture of Me"	Jimbeau Hinson	2:47
4.	"Before the Next Teardrop Falls"	Vivian Keith; Ben Peters	2:47
5.	"Papa's Knee"	Richard Supa	3:07

Side two
No.	Title	Writer(s)	Length
1.	"Now He's Coming Home"	Steve Gibb	4:03
2.	"You're the First, the Last, My Everything"	B. White; T. Sepe; P. S. Radcliffe	2:41
3.	"Still"	Bill Anderson	3:17
4.	"Lucky"	Dennis Linde	2:28
5.	"Feel Free"	Tupper Saussy	3:05

== Technical personnel ==
All credits are adapted from the liner notes of Sincerely, Brenda Lee.

- Lea Jane Berinati – Backing vocals
- Herb Burnette – Photography
- Martin Cerf – Liner notes
- Bill McElhiney – String arrangements
- The Holladays – Backing vocals
- The Nashville Sounds – Backing vocals
- Bill Ward – Photography

== Chart performance ==
Chart (1975)	Peak position
US Top Country Albums (Billboard)	23

== Release history ==
Release history and formats for Sincerely, Brenda Lee
Region	Date	Format	Label	Ref.
Various	November 1975	Vinyl LP; 8-track cartridge	MCA Records	
