= Merry Christmas from Brenda Lee =

Studio album by Brenda Lee
- Released: October 19, 1964
- Studios: Bradley Studios, Nashville, Tennessee
- Genre: Christmas
- Length: 29:07
- Label: Decca
- Producer: Owen Bradley

Brenda Lee chronology
By Request (1964)	Merry Christmas from Brenda Lee (1964)	Brenda Lee Sings Top Teen Hits (1965)

Singles from Merry Christmas from Brenda Lee
- 1. "Jingle Bell Rock/Winter Wonderland" Released: October 1964; 2. "This Time of the Year/Christmas Will Be Just Another Lonely Day" Released: October 1964

Professional ratings
Review scores
Source	Rating
AllMusic	3/5 stars

Merry Christmas from Brenda Lee is the eleventh album by American singer Brenda Lee, released on October 19, 1964 by Decca Records. in 1999, the album was re-released on MCA Nashville, expanded to 18 tracks, and retitled Rockin' Around the Christmas Tree: The Decca Christmas Recordings, which has remained in print ever since.

== Track listing ==
Side A
No.	Title	Writer(s)	Length
1.	"Rockin' Around the Christmas Tree"	Johnny Marks	2:07
2.	"This Time of the Year"	Cliff Owens; Jesse Hollis	2:37
3.	"Jingle Bell Rock"	Joe Beal; Jim Boothe	2:11
4.	"Strawberry Snow"	Ronnie Self	2:30
5.	"Santa Claus Is Comin' to Town"	John Frederick Coots; Haven Gillespie	2:14
6.	"Silver Bells"	Jay Livingston; Ray Evans	2:08

Side B
No.	Title	Writer(s)	Length
1.	"Winter Wonderland"	Felix Bernard; Richard Bernhard Smith	2:22
2.	"Blue Christmas"	Billy Hayes; Jay W. Johnson	2:45
3.	"A Marshmallow World"	Carl Sigman; Peter DeRose	2:30
4.	"Christmas Will Be Just Another Lonely Day"	Lee Jackson; Patti Seymour	2:27
5.	"Frosty the Snowman"	Walter E. "Jack" Rollins; Steve Nelson	2:21
6.	"The Angel and the Little Blue Bell"	Johnny MacRae	2:54

== Chart positions ==
Chart performance for Merry Christmas from Brenda Lee
Chart (1964–2026)	Peak position
Canadian Albums (Billboard)	11
Danish Albums (Hitlisten)	27
Dutch Albums (Album Top 100)	7
Hungarian Albums (MAHASZ)	6
Swedish Albums (Sverigetopplistan)	60
US Billboard 200	12

Singles

Year	Single	Chart	Peak position
1964	"Christmas Will Be Just Another Lonely Day"	UK Singles Chart	25

== Release history ==
Release history and formats for Merry Christmas from Brenda Lee
Region	Date	Format	Label	Ref.
North America	October 19, 1964	Vinyl LP	Decca Records	
