= The Forester Sisters discography =

- Studio albums: 11
- Compilation albums: 4
- Singles: 23

The Forester Sisters were an American country music vocal group consisting of sisters Kathy, June, Kim, and Christy Forester. The group's discography consists of 11 studio albums, four compilation albums and 23 singles. Between 1985 and 1992, the group charted 20 singles on the Billboard Hot Country Songs chart.

== Albums ==
=== Studio albums ===
Title	Details	Peak positions	
Title	Details	US Country	US
The Forester Sisters	Release date: 1985; Label: Warner Bros. Records	4	—
Perfume, Ribbons & Pearls	Release date: 1986; Label: Warner Bros. Records	27	—
You Again	Release date: 1987; Label: Warner Bros. Records	13	—
Sincerely	Release date: 1988; Label: Warner Bros. Records	30	—
Come Hold Me	Release date: 1990; Label: Warner Bros. Records	54	—
Talkin' 'Bout Men	Release date: 1991; Label: Warner Bros. Records	16	137
I Got a Date	Release date: 1992; Label: Warner Bros. Records	—	—
More Than I Am	Release date: 1996; Label: Warner Bros. Records	—	—
"—" denotes releases that did not chart

=== Christmas albums ===
Title	Details	Peak positions
Title	Details	US Country
A Christmas Card	Release date: 1987; Label: Warner Bros. Records	66
New Star Shining	Release date: 2002; Label: 4 Sisters / self-released	

=== Gospel albums ===
Title	Details
Family Faith	Release date: 1988; Label: Warner Bros/ Heartland Music
All I Need	Release date: 1989; Label: Warner Bros. Records
Sunday Meetin'	Release date: 1993; Label: JCI / Warner Music
Greatest Gospel Hits	Release date: 1997; Label: Warner Resound

=== Compilation albums ===
Title	Details	Peak positions
Title	Details	US Country
Greatest Hits	Release date: 1989; Label: Warner Bros. Records	52

== Singles ==
Year	Single	Peak positions		Album
Year	Single	US Country	CAN Country	Album
1985	"(That's What You Do) When You're in Love"	10	—	The Forester Sisters
1985	"I Fell in Love Again Last Night"	1	3	The Forester Sisters
1985	"Just in Case"	1	2	The Forester Sisters
1986	"Mama's Never Seen Those Eyes"	1	1	The Forester Sisters
1986	"Lonely Alone"	2	3	Perfume, Ribbons & Pearls
1987	"Too Many Rivers"	5	4	You Again
1987	"You Again"	1	3	You Again
1987	"Lyin' in His Arms Again"	5	5	You Again
1988	"Letter Home"	9	7	Sincerely
1988	"Sincerely"	8	11	Sincerely
1989	"Love Will"	7	20	Sincerely
1989	"Don't You"	9	15	Greatest Hits
1989	"Leave It Alone"	7	6	Greatest Hits
1990	"Drive South" (with The Bellamy Brothers)	63	60	Come Hold Me
1990	"Nothing's Gonna Bother Me Tonight"	63	—	Come Hold Me
1990	"Old Enough to Know"	—	—	Come Hold Me
1991	"Men"	8	14	Talkin' Bout Men
1991	"Too Much Fun"	62	—	Talkin' Bout Men
1991	"Let Not Your Heart Be Troubled"	—	—	Talkin' Bout Men
1991	"That Makes One of Us"	—	—	Talkin' Bout Men
1992	"What'll You Do About Me"	74	—	I Got a Date
1992	"I Got a Date"	58	68	I Got a Date
1996	"More Than I Am"	—	—	More Than I Am
"—" denotes releases that did not chart

=== As a featured artist ===
Year	Single	Peak positions		Album
Year	Single	US Country	CAN Country	Album
1986	"Too Much Is Not Enough" (The Bellamy Brothers with The Forester Sisters)	1	1	Country Rap

== Music videos ==
Year	Video	Director
1985	"I Fell in Love Again Last Night"	Paula Walker
1990	"Old Enough to Know"	Charley Randazzo
1991	"Men"	Larry Boothby
1992	"I Got a Date"	Wayne Miller
