= Greatest Hits (The Forester Sisters album) =

Greatest hits album by The Forester Sisters
- Released: 1989
- Genre: Country
- Length: 33:19
- Label: Warner Bros.
- Producer: Barry Beckett; Emory Gordy Jr. Jim Ed Norman; James Stroud

The Forester Sisters chronology
All I Need (1989)	Greatest Hits (1989)	Come Hold Me (1990)

Greatest Hits is the only compilation album by American country music group The Forester Sisters. It was released in 1989 via Warner Bros. Records. It includes the singles "Don't You" and "Leave It Alone".

== Track listing ==
No.	Title	Writer(s)	Length
1.	"(That's What You Do) When You're in Love"	Ken Bell, Terry Skinner, J. L. Wallace	3:03
2.	"I Fell in Love Again Last Night"	Thom Schuyler, Paul Overstreet	3:13
3.	"You Again"	Overstreet, Don Schlitz	3:17
4.	"Letter Home"	Wendy Waldman	3:36
5.	"Leave It Alone"	Radney Foster, Bill Lloyd	3:06
6.	"Too Much Is Not Enough" (with The Bellamy Brothers)	David Bellamy, Ron Taylor	3:53
7.	"Just in Case"	J. P. Pennington, Sonny LeMaire	2:25
8.	"Don't You"	Otha Young, Johnny Pierce	3:23
9.	"Lonely Alone"	J. D. Martin, John Jarrard	3:29
10.	"Sincerely"	Alan Freed, Harvey Fuqua	3:54

== Charts ==
Chart (1989)	Peak position
US Top Country Albums (Billboard)	25
