= You Again (disambiguation) =

You Again is a 2010 American comedy film.

You Again may also refer to:

- You Again (album), by the Forester Sisters, 1987
  - "You Again" (song), the album's title track
- You Again?, a sitcom
- "You Again", a 1995 song by Shihad from Killjoy

== See also ==
- It's You Again (disambiguation)
