= Love Is Everywhere =

Love Is Everywhere may refer to:

- "Love Is Everywhere", a song written by Dennis Linde, performed by the Oak Ridge Boys and Mel McDaniel
- "Love Is Everywhere", a song by Crowfoot
- "Love Is Everywhere", a 1969 song by Anita Harris
- "Love Is Everywhere", a song by Pharoah Sanders from the album Love in Us All, 1974
- "Love Is Everywhere", a song by John Denver from the album Windsong, 1975
- "Love Is Everywhere", a song by Stephanie Mills from the album Love Has Lifted Me, 1982
- "Love Is Everywhere", a song by David Cicero from the album Future Boy, 1992
- "Love Is Everywhere", a song by Caught in the Act from the album Caught in the Act of Love, 1995
- "Love Is Everywhere", a song by the Call from the album To Heaven and Back, 1997
- "Love Is Everywhere", a 1998 song by the Mooney Suzuki
- "Love Is Everywhere", a song by Bob Schneider from the album I'm Good Now, 2004
- "Love Is Everywhere", a song by Sarah Sharp on the soundtrack to the 2010 film When Harry Tries to Marry
- "Ljubav je svuda", a 2013 song by Moje 3 whose title translates to "Love Is Everywhere"
- "Love Is Everywhere", a song by Moumoon from the album Pain Killer, 2013 (single released in 2012)
- "Love Is Everywhere", a song by Magdalena Bay from the album Imaginal Disk, 2024
- "Love Is Everywhere (Beware)", a song by Wilco from the album Ode to Joy, 2019
- "Revival (Love Is Everywhere)", a song by the Allman Brothers Band from the album Idlewild South, 1970
- Engeyum Kadhal, a 2011 Indian film whose title translates to "Love Is Everywhere"
