= List of songs written by Dennis Linde =

This is an alphabetical list of songs written or co–written by the American songwriter Dennis Linde.

"Song" – artist (co–writers)

== A ==
- "All Fall Down" – Roger Miller
- "Another Golden Oldie Night for Wendy" – England Dan & John Ford Coley

== B ==
- "Bad Love" – Tom Jones
- "Belinda" – Roy Orbison
- "The Big Revival" – John Anderson, Montgomery Gentry, Kenny Chesney
- "Bondeblå" – Hellbillies (Arne Moslatten)
- "Bone Dry" – George Jones (Don Devaney)
- "A Blue Guitar" – Tanya Tucker
- "Bubba Shot the Jukebox" – Mark Chesnutt
- "Burning Love" – Arthur Alexander, Elvis Presley, Travis Tritt, Wynonna Judd

== C ==
- "Call Me Honey" – Arthur Alexander
- "Call Me in Tahiti" – Arthur Alexander
- "Call Me John Doe" – Joe Diffie
- "Callin' Baton Rouge" – New Grass Revival, The Oak Ridge Boys, Garth Brooks, Billie Jo Spears
- "Can I Make You Feel It" – The Crickets
- "Can't Wait" – Roy Orbison (Alan Rush)
- "Cast Iron Heart" – Pearl River, Linda Davis, Blackhawk
- "Christmas Eve Can Kill You" – The Everly Brothers
- "Colonel Maggie" – Roger Miller
- "Cool Me in the River of Love" – Michael Johnson, Six Shooter
- "Cool Rider" – Michelle Pfeiffer in Grease 2
- "Come On Rain" – The Oak Ridge Boys
- "Crystal Day" – Roger Miller

== D ==
- "Deep in Louisiana" – The Oak Ridge Boys
- "Dr. Rock N. Roll" – Sawyer Brown
- "Down and Dirty" – Johnny Lee
- "Down in a Ditch" – Joe Diffie
- "Down into Muddy Water" – Brother Phelps, Shelly Fairchild, Aaron Neville
- "Down to the Station" – B. W. Stevenson

== F ==
- "Five Gallon Tear" – Aaron Tippin

== G ==
- "Goodbye Earl" – the Chicks
- "Goodbye Marie" – Bobby Goldsboro, Kenny Rogers, Mel McDaniel

== H ==
- "Had a Dream (For the Heart)" – Elvis Presley, The Judds, Teresa Brewer
- "Heaven Bound (I'm Ready)" – The Oak Ridge Boys, Shenandoah
- "Hello, I Am Your Heart" – Manfred Mann's Earth Band, Nitty Gritty Dirt Band
- "Hold On, Elroy" – Dude Mowrey
- "Holdin' On to You" – The Oak Ridge Boys
- "Hook, Line and Sinker" – Blackhawk

== I ==
- "I Don't Really Want You" – Travis Wammack (1972), Roy Orbison (1977)
- "I Don't Want Nobody ('Ceptin' You) – Toni Brown and Terry Garthwaite
- "I Got a Feelin' in My Body" – Elvis Presley
- "I Got It for You" – Billy Swan
- "I'm Comin' Home" – Arthur Alexander
- "I'm Gonna Get You" – Eddy Raven
- "I'm Tired of Singing My Song in Las Vegas" – The Everly Brothers
- "In a Letter to You" – Shakin' Stevens, Eddy Raven
- "It Sure Is Monday" – Mark Chesnutt

== J ==
- "Janie Baker's Love Slave" – Shenandoah
- "John Deere Green" – Joe Diffie
- "Junior's in Love" – Joe Diffie

== K ==
- "Kick It" - The Bo-Keys
- "Kitty Star" - The Good Brothers, Ron Nigrini

== L ==
- "Lola's Love" – Ricky Van Shelton, Lee Greenwood, Sawyer Brown
- "Long Long Texas Road" – Roy Drusky
- "Lookout Mountain" – Brother Phelps
- "Love Is Everywhere" – The Oak Ridge Boys, Mel McDaniel
- "Love Rustler" – Delbert McClinton, Foghat
- "The Love She Found in Me" – Gary Morris, Michael Johnson, Pat Boone (under the title, "Give Her the Thorns, and She'll Find the Roses") (Bob Morrison)
- "Love You Baby, to the Bone" – Billy Swan
- "Lucky" – Billy Swan

== M ==
- "The Man Who Stayed in Monterey" – Roger Miller
- "Mary Ann Is a Pistol" – Brother Phelps, Chris Ward
- "Meanwhile Back in Abilene" – Roger Miller
- "Miss Difficult" – Cowboy Crush
- "My Baby's Gone" – The Judds, Sawyer Brown
- "Mornin Mornin" – Bobby Goldsboro

== N ==
- "Night Is Fallin' in My Heart" – J. P. Pennington, Diamond Rio

== O ==
- "Our Love Goes Marching On" – B. J. Thomas

== Q ==
- "Queen of My Double Wide Trailer" – Sammy Kershaw

== R ==
- "The 'R' Word" – Confederate Railroad
- "Reproduction" - Grease 2
- "Ridin' High" – The Everly Brothers
- "Rock-a-Billy Boy" – Mel McDaniel

== S ==
- "The Scene of the Crime" – Jo-El Sonnier
- "Send in the Rodeo Clowns" – Sammy Kershaw
- "Singin' to the Scarecrow" – Sherrié Austin, Nitty Gritty Dirt Band
- "So Shy" – Donny Osmond
- "Southbound Train" – Nitty Gritty Dirt Band, Charlie Floyd
- "Still Life in Blue" – Sawyer Brown
- "Swept Away" – Billy Swan

== T ==
- "T.J.'s Last Ride" – Roger Miller
- "The Talkin' Song Repair Blues" – Alan Jackson
- "Ten Pound Hammer" – 4 Runner, Aaron Tippin, Barbara Mandrell
- "The Time Machine" – T. Graham Brown
- "Then It's Love" – Don Williams
- "Three-Armed Poker Playin' River Rat" – The Everly Brothers
- "Tom Green County Fair" – Roger Miller
- "Train Long Gone" – Randy Travis

== U ==
- "Under Suspicion" – Delbert McClinton, Roy Orbison, Robert Palmer
- "Under the Kudzu" – Shenandoah

== V ==
- "Vanessa" – Billy Swan, Shakin Stevens

== W ==
- "Walkin' a Broken Heart" – Don Williams
- "What'll You Do About Me" – Steve Earle, The Forester Sisters, McGuffey Lane, John Schneider, Doug Supernaw, Randy Travis, Nitty Gritty Dirt Band
- "When I Miss You" – Robin Lee
- "When I Say Forever" – Chris LeDoux
- "Where Have All the Average People Gone" – Roger Miller
- "Wild Flowers in a Mason Jar (The Farm)" – John Denver
- "Wild Love" – Joy Lynn White

== X ==
- "X Marks the Spot"

== Y ==
- "Your Love Made Me This Way" – The Oak Ridge Boys

== Z ==
- "Zoot Suit Baby"
