= Wild Child (Moumoon song) =

Single by Moumoon
- B-side: "Start It Now"
- Released: May 2, 2012
- Genre: J-pop
- Length: 3:05
- Label: Avex Trax
- Songwriters: Yuka, K. Masaki
- Producer: Moumoon

Moumoon singles chronology
"Love is Everywhere" (2012)	"Wild Child" (2012)	"Dreamer Dreamer" / "Dokoemo Ikanaiyo" (2012)

"Wild Child" is a song by the Japanese duo Moumoon. It is the 15th single (13th under Avex Trax) of the duo. It was released on May 2, 2012, in 3 different editions: CD+DVD, CD only and a Limited Anime Edition.

== Composition ==
"Wild Child" and the B-side "Start It Now" were written by the member Yuka and produced by the member Kousuke Masaki.

== Promotion ==
"Wild Child" is being used as ending theme song for the anime "Yu-Gi-Oh! Zexal". A Yu-Gi-Oh! Zexal edition of the single was released including a Yu-Gi-Oh! sticker. "Start It Now" was used as ending theme song for NHK's show "Aphrodite no Rashinban".

== Track listing ==
All lyrics are written by Yuka; all music is composed by Kousuke Masaki.

CD Only and Anime edition
No.	Title	Length
1.	"Wild Child"	3:05
2.	"Start It Now"	3:54
3.	"No Night Land Medley"	5:02
4.	"Wild Child" (Instrumental)	3:05
5.	"Start It Now" (Instrumental)	3:49
Total length:		18:53

CD+DVD edition
No.	Title	Length
1.	"Wild Child"	3:05
2.	"Start It Now"	3:54
3.	"Wild Child" (Instrumental)	3:05
4.	"Start It Now" (Instrumental)	3:49
Total length:		13:52

iTunes Store edition
No.	Title	Length
1.	"Wild Child"	3:05
2.	"Start It Now"	3:54
Total length:		6:58

DVD
No.	Title	Length
1.	"Wild Child" (Music video)
2.	"Wild Child" (Music video - Making-of)

== Charts ==
Released	Oricon Chart	Peak	Debut sales	Sales total
May 2, 2012	Daily Singles Chart	16	4,154	4,154
May 2, 2012	Weekly Singles Chart	24	4,154	4,154

== Release history ==
Country	Date	Format	Label
Japan	May 2, 2012	Digital download, CD, Ringtone	Avex Trax
