= The Versatile Brenda Lee =

Studio album by Brenda Lee
- Released: May 17, 1965
- Recorded: October 1964–February 1965
- Studios: Columbia, Nashville, Tennessee
- Genres: Nashville Sound; pop
- Label: Decca
- Producer: Owen Bradley

Brenda Lee chronology
| Brenda Lee Sings Top Teen Hits (1965) | The Versatile Brenda Lee (1965) | Too Many Rivers (1965) |

Singles from The Versatile Brenda Lee
- 1. "Truly, Truly True" Released: March 1965

The Versatile Brenda Lee is the thirteenth studio album by American singer Brenda Lee. It was released on May 17, 1965, by Decca Records and was her twelfth studio album. The album was a collection of 12 tracks and was named for the album's mixed range of material. Of its songs was Lee's single "Truly, Truly True", which became a charting US single in 1965. The album was met with mixed reviews following its release.

== Background, recording and content ==
Brenda Lee had risen to stardom in her teens recording a variety of material. Beginning in the early 1960s, Lee recorded pop music had her greatest commercial success with songs like "I'm Sorry", "I Want to Be Wanted" and "Break It to Me Gently". These songs and several others rose to the top ten in the US and the UK through 1963. Many of her singles reached progressively lower positions as the 1960s progressed, but she continued having top 20 and top 40 singles. One of Lee's chart records from this period was "Truly, Truly True". It was included on The Versatile Brenda Lee.

The album project was taken from sessions held between October 1964 and February 1965 at the Columbia Studio, located in Nashville, Tennessee. All recording sessions were produced by Owen Bradley. The album contained a total of 12 tracks. The album was named for its mix of material, most of which were covers. "Few singers have the gift of versatility and the voice to make the well-known standards of the past sound rich and fresh," read the liner notes. Among its songs was "Don't Blame Me" and "Willow Weep for Me".

== Release, reception and singles ==
The Versatile Brenda Lee was released on May 17, 1965, by Decca Records. The label distributed the album as a vinyl LP, offered in both mono and stereo formats. Six songs appeared on each side of the record. It was Lee's twelfth studio album in her career. The project was given mixed reviews by critics. It was reviewed favorably by Billboard magazine who noted the album proves how Lee "can win a teen audience with current pop material and equally appeal to the adult market". Meanwhile, critic-composer Gene Lees of Hi-Fi Stereo Review gave the album a less favorable response. "She certainly is versatile, as the album title suggests; she can perform badly in more styles than anybody I can think of." AllMusic rated the album two out of five stars without a written review provided. The album's only single was "Truly, Truly True", which was first issued by Decca in March 1965. That year, the single rose to the number 54 position on the US Hot 100 and number nine on the US adult contemporary chart.

== Track listing ==
Side one
| No. | Title | Writer(s) | Length |
|---|---|---|---|
| 1. | "Yesterday's Gone" | Wendy Kidd; Chad Stuart | 2:43 |
| 2. | "Dear Heart" | Ray Evans; Jay Livingston; Henry Mancini | 2:45 |
| 3. | "I Still Miss Someone" | Johnny Cash | 2:48 |
| 4. | "How Glad I Am" | Larry Harrison; Jimmy Williams | 2:50 |
| 5. | "Almost There" | Jack Keller; Gloria Shayne | – |
| 6. | "Don't Blame Me" | Dorothy Fields; Jimmy McHugh | 2:59 |

Side two
| No. | Title | Writer(s) | Length |
|---|---|---|---|
| 1. | "Willow Weep for Me" | Ann Ronnell | 2:26 |
| 2. | "Truly, Truly True (Tenkrat)" | Arthur Altman; Dalibor Basler; Vladimir Rohlena; Al Stillman | 2:40 |
| 3. | "Love Letters" | Edward Heyman; Victor Young | 2:02 |
| 4. | "The Birds and the Bees" | Barry Stuart | 2:04 |
| 5. | "La Vie en rose" | Edith Piaf | 2:58 |
| 6. | "Maybe" | Al Flynn; Frank Madden | 2:47 |

== Personnel ==
All credits are adapted from the liner notes of The Versatile Brenda Lee.

- Owen Bradley – Producer
- Hal Buksbaum – Photography
- Louella O. Parsons – Liner Notes

== Release history ==
| Region | Date | Format | Label | Ref. |
|---|---|---|---|---|
| Australia | May 17, 1965 | Vinyl LP (Mono) | Festival Records | |
| Japan | May 17, 1965 | Vinyl LP | Decca Records | |
| North America | May 17, 1965 | Vinyl LP (Mono); Vinyl LP (Stereo) | Decca Records | |
| United Kingdom | May 17, 1965 | Vinyl LP (Mono); Vinyl LP (Stereo) | Brunswick Records | |
