= When You Loved Me =

Single by Brenda Lee

from the album Brenda Lee Sings Top Teen Hits
- B-side: "He's Sure to Remember Me"
- Released: July 1964
- Genre: Pop
- Length: 2:14
- Label: Decca 31654
- Songwriter(s): Joy Byers, Bob Tubert

Brenda Lee singles chronology
"Alone with You" (1964)	"When You Loved Me" (1964)	"Is It True" (1964)

"When You Loved Me" is a song written by Joy Byers and Bob Tubert and performed by Brenda Lee. The song reached #8 on the adult contemporary chart and #47 on the Billboard Hot 100 in 1964. It was featured on her 1965 album, Brenda Lee Sings Top Teen Hits.

The single's B-side, "He's Sure to Remember Me", reached #135 on the Billboard chart.
