= Think (Brenda Lee song) =

- Danish release picture sleeve

Single by Brenda Lee

from the album Too Many Rivers
- B-side: "The Waiting Game"
- Released: March 1964
- Genre: Country
- Length: 2:46
- Label: Decca 31599
- Songwriter(s): Peggy Whittington

Brenda Lee singles chronology
"As Usual" (1963)	"Think" (1964)	"Alone with You" (1964)

"Think" is a song written by Peggy Whittington and performed by Brenda Lee. The song reached #4 on the adult contemporary chart, #25 on the Billboard Hot 100, and #26 on the UK in 1964. It also reached #62 in Australia. The song is featured on her 1965 album, Too Many Rivers.

The single's B-side, "The Waiting Game", reached #62 in Australia and #101 on the Billboard chart.
