= Sincerely (The Forester Sisters album) =

Studio album by The Forester Sisters
- Released: 1988
- Genre: Country
- Length: 33:26
- Label: Warner Nashville
- Producer: Wendy Waldman (tracks 3, 6, 7, 9); Jim Ed Norman (tracks 1, 4, 5, 10); Barry Beckett & James Stroud (tracks 2 & 8)

The Forester Sisters chronology
You Again (1987)	Sincerely (1988)	Come Hold Me (1990)

Singles from Sincerely
- 1. "Letter Home" Released: June 25, 1988; 2. "Sincerely" Released: October 1988; 3. "Love Will" Released: February 18, 1989

Sincerely is the fourth studio album by the American country music group The Forester Sisters. It was released in 1988 via Warner Records Nashville.

== Content ==
Three singles charted from the album: "Letter Home", the title track, and "Love Will". These all made top-ten on the Hot Country Songs charts in 1988.

"These Lips Don't Know How to Say Goodbye" was later a top-ten hit for Doug Stone in 1991.

== Critical reception ==
Rating it 4 out of 5 stars, Jan Walker of The Orlando Sentinel said that "there's a confident sound to each of the 10 songs on the album, a showcase for the seemingly effortless natural harmony of four sibling voices." William Ruhlmann of AllMusic reviewed the album with favor as well, stating that "Already the possessors of a wonderful vocal harmony style, The Foresters hit a peak when they hooked up with writer/producer Wendy Waldman for this album, cutting her 'Letter Home' and other strong material".

== Track listing ==
No.	Title	Writer(s)	Length
1.	"I've Just Seen a Face"	John Lennon; Paul McCartney	2:21
2.	"Love Will"	Don Pfrimmer; Byron Gallimore	3:34
3.	"Letter Home"	Wendy Waldman	3:37
4.	"These Lips Don't Know How to Say Goodbye"	Harlan Howard	3:30
5.	"Sincerely"	Harvey Fuqua; Alan Freed	3:54
6.	"Things Will Grow"	Don Schlitz	3:14
7.	"Some People"	Carol Chase	3:47
8.	"On the Other Side of the Gate"	Susan Longacre; Russell Smith	2:36
9.	"You Love Me"	Matraca Berg; Ronnie Samoset	3:27
10.	"A Matter of Time"	Karen Staley	3:26
Total length:			33:26

== Chart performance ==
Chart (1988)	Peak position
US Top Country Albums (Billboard)	30
