= Pain Killer (Moumoon album) =

- CD+Blu-ray and Digital cover

Studio album by Moumoon
- Released: January 30, 2013
- Recorded: 2012
- Genre: Pop, dance-pop
- Length: 50:08
- Language: Japanese
- Label: Avex Trax

Moumoon chronology
No Night Land (2012)	Pain Killer (2013)

Singles from Pain Killer
- 1. "Love is Everywhere" Released: March 14, 2012; 2. "Hanabi" Released: August 29, 2012; 3. "Dreamer Dreamer" / "Doko e mo Ikanai yo" Released: December 12, 2012

Pain Killer is the fourth studio album by Japanese pop duo moumoon. It was released on January 30, 2013 in 4 different editions.

== Editions ==
The album was released in four editions:

- CD+Blu-ray: The CD+Blu-ray edition include the album with standard track list, a Blu-ray disc including the live specials "Moumoon Studio Live 2013", "Moumoon Live History", the music videos of "Midori no Michi" and "Utsukushii Hito", and a special making from the album. The first press edition comes with a different apple jacket cover.
- CD+2DVD: The CD+2DVD edition include the album with standard track list, two DVDs including the live specials "Moumoon Studio Live 2013", "Moumoon Live History" on the disc 1 and the music videos of "Midori no Michi" and "Utsukushii Hito", and a special making from the album on the disc 2. The first press edition comes with a different apple jacket cover.
- CD only: The CD only edition will the album only with an acoustic version of the song "Flowers" as bonus track.
- Fanclub edition: The Fanclub edition include the album with standard track list, two DVDs including the live specials "Moumoon Studio Live 2013", "Moumoon Live History" on the disc 1 and the music videos of "Midori no Michi" and "Utsukushii Hito", and a special making from the album on the disc 2. It also includes a special booklet and a different jacket cover.

== Singles ==
Four songs of the album were released as singles:

The first single, "Love is Everywhere", was released on March 14, 2012 and peaked number 33 in Oricon's weekly singles chart. The song was used as theme song for the Canon's IXY TV advertisement.

The second single, "Hanabi", was released on August 29, 2012 and peaked number 29 in Oricon's weekly singles chart. The song was used as image song for the event Natsu Matsuri Hanabi Taikai.

The third and last single, "Dreamer Dreamer" / "Doko e mo Ikanai yo" is a double A-side single released on December 12, 2012 and peaked number 30 in Oricon's weekly singles chart. The song "Doko e mo Ikanai yo" was used as ending theme song for the TV drama Yuusha Yoshihiko to Akuryo no Kagi and the song "Midori no Michi", used as b-side of the single, was used as theme song for the short movie Heather Love ♡ Short Movies. All songs from the single were included on the album.

== Promotions ==
Beside the singles, two songs included on the album were used in movies and TV shows. The song "Vanitas" was used as theme song for Fuji TV's drama Dolce. The song was later released digitally on October 10, 2012. The song "Utsukushii Hito" was used as theme song for the movie Little Maesutora.

== Track listing ==
All lyrics are written by Yuka; all music is composed by Kousuke Masaki.

Official track list
No.	Title	Length
1.	"Dreamer Dreamer" (Pain Killer version)	4:23
2.	"Vanitas" (バニタス; Banitasu)	4:36
3.	"Help Me"	2:37
4.	"Pain"	4:34
5.	"Hanabi" (儚火; Fireworks)	5:15
6.	"Midori no Michi" (緑の道; Green Road)	4:43
7.	"Utsukushii Hito" (うつくしい人; Beautiful Person)	4:41
8.	"Anniversary" (アニベルセル; Aniberuseru)	4:57
9.	"Love is Everywhere" (stylized 『Love is Everywhere』)	4:28
10.	"Never Enough" (ネバイナフ; Nebainafu)	5:08
11.	"Doko e mo Ikanai yo" (どこへも行かないよ; Not Going Anywhere)	4:51
Total length:		50:08

CD only bonus track
No.	Title	Length
12.	"Flowers" (15ips acoustic version)

DVD disc 1/Blu-ray: Moumoon Studio Live 2013
No.	Title	Length
1.	"Never Enough"
2.	"Vanitas"
3.	"Dreamer Dreamer"
4.	"Butterfly Effect"
5.	"3Days Magic"
6.	"Hanabi"
7.	"Sunshine Girl"
8.	"Yes/No Continue?"
9.	"Love is Everywhere"
10.	"Hallelujah"
11.	"Doko e mo Ikanai yo"

DVD disc 1/Blu-ray: Moumoon Live History
No.	Title	Length
1.	"Heaven" (2009.10.3 "Fullmoon Live Special 2009 ~Chushu no Meigetsu~" in Hibiya Open Air Concert Hall)
2.	"Pinky Ring" (2009.10.3 "Fullmoon Live Special 2009 ~Chushu no Meigetsu~" in Hibiya Open Air Concert Hall)
3.	"Refrain" (2010.9.22 "Fullmoon Live Special 2010 ~Chushu no Meigetsu~" in Ebisu Garden Hall)
4.	"Sunshine Girl" (2011.6.13 "Fullmoon Live Tour 2011 15 Doors ~Doko Made Demo Doa~ in Nakano Sun Plaza")
5.	"Do You Remember?" (2011.6.13 "Fullmoon Live Tour 2011 15 Doors ~Doko Made Demo Doa~ in Nakano Sun Plaza")
6.	"Myself" (2011.9.11 "Fullmoon Live Special 2011 ~Chushu no Meigetsu~" in Nakano Sun Plaza)
7.	"We Go" (2012.4.1 "Fullmoon Live Tour 2012 ~Nonai Randotsua~ Final in NHK Hall")

DVD disc 2/Blu-ray
No.	Title	Length
1.	"Midori no Michi" (music video)
2.	"Utsukushii Hito" (music video)
3.	"Pain Killer" (making clip)

== Charts ==
The album debuted at number 8 on its first day of chart on Oricon and it climbed to number 4 on its second day.

=== Oricon chart ===
Released	Oricon Chart	Peak	Debut sales	Sales total
January 30, 2013	Daily Albums Chart	4	8,557	8,557
January 30, 2013	Weekly Albums Chart	12	8,557	8,557

== Release history ==
Country	Date	Format	Label
Japan	January 30, 2012	Digital download, CD	Avex Trax
