= 15 Doors =

Album by Moumoon

- Regular edition cover

Studio album by Moumoon
- Released: March 2, 2011
- Recorded: 2009–2011
- Genre: Pop
- Length: 57:02
- Language: Japanese
- Label: Avex Trax

Moumoon chronology
Spark (2010)	15 Doors (2011)	No Night Land (2012)

Singles from 15 Doors
- 1. "Evergreen" Released: February 25, 2009; 2. "On the Right" Released: July 22, 2009; 3. "Aoi Tsuki to Ambivalence na Ai" Released: November 25, 2009; 4. "Sunshine Girl" Released: May 12, 2010; 5. "Moonlight / Sky High / YAY" Released: November 10, 2010

15 Doors is the second studio album by Japanese pop duo Moumoon. It was released on March 2, 2011 in 3 different editions: 2 CD+DVD (Type A comes with all music videos released until "15 Doors" and type B comes with a live concert) and a Regular edition.

== Composition ==
All songs from the album was written by the member Yuka and produced by the member Kousuke Masaki.

== Singles ==
The album has a total of 5 singles released. The first single of the album is the song "Evergreen", released on February 25, 2009. The physical single ranked #54 in Oricon's Weekly chart. The song was chosen as theme song for the movie Kafu wo Machiwabite and ending theme song for the TV shows Akko ni Omakase and Megadigi, both from TBS.

The second single is the song "On the Right", released on July 22, 2009. It ranked #50 in Oricon's Weekly chart and stayed on the chart for 1 week. The song was used for Dinos "Fuji TV Flower" TV advertisement.

The third single is the song "Aoi Tsuki to Ambivalence na Ai" (Japanese: 青い月とアンビバレンスな愛), released on November 25, 2009. It ranked #36 in Oricon's Weekly chart and stayed on the chart for 2 weeks. The song was chosen as ending theme song for the 3D anime "To (Too)".

The fourth single is the song "Sunshine Girl", released on May 12, 2010. The single ranked #10 in Oricon's Weekly chart, making the first top 10 single of the duo. The song was chosen as theme song for Shiseido's "Anessa" and Sony Ericsson × MTV "Transform Your Xperia" TV advertisements.

The fifth and last single are the songs "Moonlight / Sky High / YAY", released on November 10, 2010. It is the first triple A-side single of the duo. It ranked #18 in Oricon's Weekly chart. "Moonlight" was used as theme song for Aeon's "Full Moon Rose" TV advertisement. "Sky High" (Japanese: スカイハイ) was used as "H.I.S." campaign song. Although all songs are A-sides, the song "Sky High" didn't enter in the album.

== Track listing ==
All lyrics are written by Yuka; all music is composed by Kousuke Masaki

Official track list
No.	Title	Length
1.	"We Go" (Intro)	1:34
2.	"15 Doors"	3:58
3.	"One Step"	4:02
4.	"Sunshine Girl"	3:50
5.	"Moonlight"	3:45
6.	"Blue Rain"	4:13
7.	"Aoi Tsuki to Ambivalence na Ai" (青い月とアンビバレンスな愛; The Blue Moon And An Ambivalent Love)	5:18
8.	"Hallelujah" (ハレルヤ; Hareruya)	4:22
9.	"YAY"	3:42
10.	"Evergreen"	5:30
11.	"Destiny"	3:19
12.	"Tengoku ni Ichiban Tooi Basho" (天国に一番遠い場所; The Farthest Place Is Heaven)	4:27
13.	"On the Right"	3:46
14.	"Happy Unbirthday"	4:41
15.	"Farewell" (Outro)	0:44
Total length:		57:02

CD Only bonus track:
No.	Title	Length
16.	"Pinky Ring" (Live from "FULLMOON LIVE SPECIAL 2010 ~中秋の名月~")

DVD - Type A: All the Best Clips
No.	Title	Length
1.	"Flowers" (Music video)
2.	"Sweet Heart" (Music video)
3.	"Do You Remember?" (Music video)
4.	"Tiny Star" (Music video)
5.	"More Than Love" (Music video)
6.	"Evergreen" (Music video)
7.	"On the Right" (Music video)
8.	"Aoi Tsuki to Ambivalence na Ai" (Music video - Movie version)
9.	"Sunshine Girl" (Music video)
10.	"Moonlight" (Music video)
11.	"YAY" (Music video)
12.	"15 Doors" (Music video)
13.	"History of moumoon"

DVD - Type B: Live DVD from "FULL MOON LIVE SPECIAL 2010"
No.	Title	Length
1.	"Spark"
2.	"Dreaming Driving"
3.	"Sunshine Girl"
4.	"On the Right"
5.	"Tiny Star"
6.	"Tomoshibi" (トモシビ; Light)
7.	"Plastic Joy"
8.	"Refrain" (リフレイン; Rifurein)
9.	"Do You Remember?"
10.	"Good Night" (Encore)

- The full version of the track "We Go", previously released as an intro, was released on the following album No Night Land.

== Charts ==
=== Oricon Chart ===
Released	Oricon Chart	Peak	Debut Sales	Sales Total	Chart Run
March 2, 2011	Daily Albums Chart	8	14,905	30,000+	16 weeks
March 2, 2011	Weekly Albums Chart	8	14,905	30,000+	16 weeks

=== Other charts ===
Chart	Peak position
Billboard Japan Top Albums	8

== Release history ==
Country	Date	Format	Label
Japan	March 2, 2011	Digital download, CD	Avex Trax
