= Is It True =

Is It True may refer to:

== Names ==
- Is It True (horse)

== Music ==
- "Is It True" (Brenda Lee song), 1964
- "Is It True" (Tame Impala song), 2020
- "Is It True?" (Yohanna song), 2009
- "Is It True", a 1975 song by Barrett Strong
- "Is It True", a song by the Eagles from the 1974 album On the Border
- "Is It True?", a song by Maximo Park from the 2014 album Too Much Information
- "Is It True", a song by Saint Etienne from the 1997 album Continental
- "Is It True", a 2018 song by Target

== See also ==
- Is It True What They Say About Dixie? Al Jolson
