= Prentiss Barnes =

American singer

Prentiss Barnes (April 12, 1925 – October 1, 2006) was an American rhythm and blues singer in the 1950s. Barnes was born in Magnolia, Mississippi. He sang bass for the legendary vocal group The Moonglows which had such hits as "Sincerely" and "The Ten Commandments of Love". Mentored by Alan Freed, the group’s doo-wop harmony style achieved great success on the national R&B charts and recorded on Chess Records.

Barnes was inducted into the Rock and Roll Hall of Fame in 2000 as a member of the Moonglows. He has also been inducted into the Mississippi Musicians Hall of Fame, The Vocal Group Hall of Fame, and The Doo Wop Hall of Fame. In 1995, he received the Rhythm and Blues Foundation Pioneer Award. He was killed in an automobile accident outside Magnolia, Mississippi in 2006.
