= Too Many Rivers (album) =

Studio album by Brenda Lee
- Released: September 2, 1965
- Recorded: January 1964–July 1965
- Studios: Columbia, Nashville, Tennessee
- Genres: Nashville Sound; pop
- Label: Decca
- Producer: Owen Bradley

Brenda Lee chronology
The Versatile Brenda Lee (1965)	Too Many Rivers (1965)	Bye Bye Blues (1966)

Singles from Too Many Rivers
- 1. "Think" Released: March 1964; 2. "Too Many Rivers/No One" Released: May 1965

Too Many Rivers is the fourteenth studio album by American singer Brenda Lee. It was released on September 2, 1965, via Decca Records and was her thirteenth studio album. The disc consisted of 12 tracks that were mostly covers of songs recorded by other artists. Of its new tracks were two singles of Lee's: "Think" and "Too Many Rivers". Both tracks made record charts in the United States, Australia and the United Kingdom. The title track was the highest-charting single, reaching the US top 20 in 1965. The album was met with positive reviews from critics.

== Background, recording and content ==
Considered a "child prodigy", Brenda Lee was 11 years old when she signed a recording contract with Decca Records in 1956. She began recording Rockabilly material and eventually graduated to pop material. Between 1959 and 1963, Lee had a series of US top ten singles, some of which topped the record charts. As the sixties decade progressed, Lee continued having chart records, but many fell into the US top 20 and were more commercially successful in other countries. In 1965, Lee's single "Too Many Rivers" became a hit and would be the name of her next studio album.

Too Many Rivers was taken from sessions recorded between January 1964 and July 1965. The sessions were all held at the Columbia Studio in Nashville, Tennessee. The recording sessions were all produced by Owen Bradley. The album was a collection of 12 tracks. Some of the tracks were new songs, including the title track, "Think" and "Truer Than True". Remaining tracks were covers of songs first recorded by other artists. Among its covers was "Call Me Irresponsible", "Everybody Loves Somebody", "Hello, Dolly!" and "Whispering".

== Release, critical reception and chart performance ==
Too Many Rivers was released by Decca Records on September 2, 1965. It marked the thirteenth studio album released in Lee's career. It was distributed as a vinyl LP, offered in both mono and stereo versions. The record featured six tracks on each side. The album was promoted through a series of nightclubs and venue engagements. Too Many Rivers was met with positive reviews from critics and publications. Billboard commented, "Miss Lee displays her boundless versatility for equal feel of today's pop music as well as the evergreens in this well balanced program. This package should spiral to the top of the LP charts". Hi-Fi Stereo Review found the album to be "great music for relaxation". AllMusic rated the album 4.5 out of five stars. Too Many Rivers reached the number 36 position on the US Billboard 200 record chart in 1965. It was Lee's first album to make the chart since 1964's By Request and her first top 40 entry since 1963's ..."Let Me Sing".

== Singles ==
Two singles were included on Too Many Rivers. The earliest single was "Think", which was first issued by Decca Records in March 1964. "Think" reached number 25 on the US Hot 100 and number four on the US adult contemporary chart. Internationally, it reached number 62 in Australia and number 26 in the UK. The second single was the album's title track, issued by Decca in May 1965. It was the disc's highest-charting single, rising to the number 13 position on the US Hot 100 and number two on the US adult contemporary chart. Internationally, it reached number 99 in Australia and number 22 in the UK. The song's B-side "No One" reached number 98 on the US Hot 100 and number 25 on the US adult contemporary chart.

== Track listing ==
Side one
No.	Title	Writer(s)	Length
1.	"It's Not Unusual"	Les Reed; Gordon Mills	2:10
2.	"Call Me Irresponsible"	Jimmy Van Heusen; Sammy Cahn	2:56
3.	"Too Many Rivers"	Harlan Howard	2:46
4.	"Who Can I Turn To (When Nobody Needs Me)"	Anthony Newley; Leslie Bricusse	2:07
5.	"Whispering"	John Schonberger; Richard Coburn; Vincent Rose	2:20
6.	"Stormy Weather (Keeps Raining All the Time)"	Harold Arlen; Ted Koehler	3:31

Side two
No.	Title	Writer(s)	Length
1.	"Hello, Dolly!"	Jerry Herman	2:20
2.	"Unforgettable"	Irving Gordon	3:00
3.	"Everybody Loves Somebody"	Sam Coslow; Irving Taylor; Ken Lane	2:40
4.	"No One"	Doc Pomus; Mort Shuman	2:43
5.	"Truer Than True"	Robert Turbert; Gus Backus; Steve Alaimo; Udo Westgard	2:32
6.	"Think"	Peggy Whittington	2:18

== Personnel ==
All credits are adapted from the liner notes of Too Many Rivers.

- Owen Bradley – Producer
- Bill McElhiney – Arrangements
- Cam Mullins – Arrangements

== Chart performance ==
Chart (1965)	Peak position
US Billboard 200	36

== Release history ==
Region	Date	Format	Label	Ref.
Australia	September 2, 1965	Vinyl LP (Mono)	Festival	
Germany	September 2, 1965	Vinyl LP	Decca Records	
Japan	September 2, 1965	Vinyl LP	Decca Records	
North America	September 2, 1965	Vinyl LP (Mono); Vinyl LP (Stereo)	Decca Records	
United Kingdom	September 2, 1965	Vinyl LP (Mono); Vinyl LP (Stereo)	Brunswick Records	
