= Love Will =

Love Will may refer to:

- Love Will (song), single by The Forester Sisters
- Love Will..., 2013 studio album by Trace Adkins
