= Early Tracks =

Early Tracks may refer to:

- Early Tracks (EP), a 2000 EP by Old 97's
- Early Tracks (album), a 1987 album by Steve Earle
