= No Night Land =

- Regular edition cover

Studio album by Moumoon
- Released: February 8, 2012
- Recorded: 2011–2012
- Genre: Pop, dance-pop
- Length: 38:12
- Language: Japanese
- Label: Avex Trax

Moumoon chronology
15 Doors (2011)	No Night Land (2012)	Pain Killer (2013)

Singles from No Night Land
- 1. "Chu Chu" Released: August 3, 2011; 2. "Uta wo Utaou" Released: December 14, 2011

No Night Land is the third studio album by Japanese pop duo Moumoon. It was released on February 8, 2012, in 2 different editions: CD+2DVD and a Regular edition.

== Singles ==
The album has 2 singles. The first single is the song "Chu Chu", released on August 3, 2011. The single peaked #11 in Oricon's Weekly chart.

The second and last single from the album is "Uta wo Utaou". It was released on December 14, 2011, and ranked #27 in Oricon's Weekly chart.

== Promotions ==
Some songs from the album were used in TV advertisements for products and for TV shows. The song "Chu Chu" was used as theme song for the make-up brand Shiseido "Maquillage" TV ad. "Yes/No Continue?" was used as theme song for Cartoon Network's animation The Amazing World of Gumball in Japan and for Jill Stuart TV ad. "Tomodachi / Koibito" was used for Lotte's Ghana TV ad. And the song "Bon Appetit" for Asashi's "Fauchon" TV ad.

== Track listing ==
All lyrics are written by Yuka; all music is composed by Kousuke Masaki

Official tracklist
No.	Title	Length
1.	"Chu Chu"	3:29
2.	"Yes/No Continue?"	3:39
3.	"Jet Coaster" (ジェットコースター; Jettokōsutā)	3:31
4.	"Butterfly Effect"	4:53
5.	"Uta wo Utaou" (うたをうたおう; Sing a Song)	4:09
6.	"I Found Love."	4:54
7.	"Tomodachi / Koibito" (トモダチ/コイビト; Friends / Lovers)	3:56
8.	"Bon Appetit"	4:45
9.	"We Go"	4:59
Total length:		38:12

CD only bonus track
No.	Title	Length
10.	"Good Night" (Studio live recording)	4:58
Total length:		43:09

DVD disc 1: Music videos & Making-of
No.	Title	Length
1.	"Chu Chu" (Music video)
2.	"Uta wo Utaou" (Music video)
3.	"Tomodachi / Koibito" (Music video)
4.	"Bon Appetit" (Music video)
5.	"Tomodachi / Koibito" (Music video - Making of)
6.	"Bon Appetit" (Music video - Making of)
7.	"No Night Land" (Album making of)

DVD disc 2: Live concert
No.	Title	Length
1.	"FULLMOON LIVE SPECIAL 2011 Chuushuu no Meigetsu @ Nakano Sun Plaza" (FULLMOON LIVE SPECIAL 2011 中秋の名月 @中野サンプラザ)
2.	"FULLMOON LIVE SPECIAL 2011 Chuushuu no Meigetsu @ Nakano Sun Plaza (Documentary)" (FULLMOON LIVE SPECIAL 2011 中秋の名月 @中野サンプラザ （Documentary）)

- The track "We Go" was previously released as an intro on the album "15 Doors".

== Chart performance ==
The album debuted at number 5 in Oricon's Daily chart and #9 in the Weekly chart, with 12,733 sold on the first week.

=== Charts ===
==== Oricon Chart ====
Released	Oricon Chart	Peak	Debut Sales	Sales Total	Chart Run
February 8, 2012	Daily Albums Chart	5	12,733	19,189	6 weeks
February 8, 2012	Weekly Albums Chart	9	12,733	19,189	6 weeks
February 8, 2012	Monthly Albums Chart	26	12,733	19,189	6 weeks

==== Other charts ====
Chart	Peak position
Billboard Japan Top Albums	10

== Release history ==
Country	Date	Format	Label
Japan	February 8, 2012	Digital download, CD	Avex Trax
