= The DeJohn Sisters =

American vocal duo

The DeJohn Sisters were an American vocal duo, Julie and Dux DeJohn (born DiGiovanni). Julie was born on March 18, 1931 and died in 1996, whilst Dux was born on January 21, 1933. Today, Dux lives in Florida and is known as "MaryAnn Barcaro".

They were born in Chester, Pennsylvania, United States, which had been the hometown of an earlier vocal group, The Four Aces. They were the daughters of a dry cleaner and worked in their parents' store after school, but while working at the club where the Four Aces were discovered, they were heard by a scout who worked for Epic Records, a subsidiary label of Columbia. On signing with Epic, they anglicized their name and made a record, "Should I Run?" which was released as catalog # 9009 by Epic. This was not a hit, but their next record, "(My Baby Don't Love Me) No More," written by the sisters with music by their brother Leo in 1955 and released as catalog #9085, became a major hit (No. 6 on the Billboard Hot 100 chart, No. 8 on the Billboard Best Sellers chart). It was, however, the only one that the sisters had. In the late 1950s they moved to the parent Columbia label, and a 28-track compilation of their recordings is available on CD. They also made an album Yes Indeed!, and at least one single for United Artists Records and four singles for a small independent label, Sunbeam Records, including the duet "Watermelon Heart" with Dick Haymes.

As the Four Aces may have inspired the DeJohn Sisters, they in turn inspired another group, The Bonnie Sisters.
