= Leave It Alone (The Forester Sisters song) =

Single by The Forester Sisters

from the album Greatest Hits
- B-side: "I Fell in Love Again Last Night"
- Released: November 25, 1989
- Genre: Country
- Length: 3:11
- Label: Warner Bros. Nashville
- Songwriters: Radney Foster, Bill Lloyd
- Producer: Wendy Waldman

The Forester Sisters singles chronology
"Don't You" (1989)	"Leave It Alone" (1989)	"Drive South" (1990)

"Leave It Alone" is a song written by Radney Foster and Bill Lloyd, and recorded by American country music group The Forester Sisters. It was released in November 1989 as the second single from their Greatest Hits compilation album. The song reached number 7 on the Billboard Hot Country Singles & Tracks chart.

== Chart performance ==
Chart (1989–1990)	Peak position
Canada Country Singles (RPM)	6
US Hot Country Songs (Billboard)	7

=== Year-end charts ===
Chart (1990)	Position
Canada Country Tracks (RPM)	61
US Country Songs (Billboard)	56
