= The Forester Sisters (album) =

Studio album by The Forester Sisters
- Released: 1985
- Studios: Muscle Shoals Sound Studios (Sheffield, Alabama); East Avalon Recorders (Muscle Shoals, Alabama); The Music Mill (Nashville, Tennessee).
- Genre: Country
- Length: 31:15
- Label: Warner Bros. Nashville
- Producers: J.L. Wallace, Terry Skinner

The Forester Sisters chronology
The Forester Sisters (1985)	Perfume, Ribbons & Pearls (1986)

Singles from The Forester Sisters
- 1. "(That's What You Do) When You're in Love" Released: January 26, 1985; 2. "I Fell in Love Again Last Night" Released: June 29, 1985; 3. "Just in Case" Released: November 2, 1985; 4. "Mama's Never Seen Those Eyes" Released: March 15, 1986

Professional ratings
Review scores
Source	Rating
Allmusic	link

The Forester Sisters is the debut studio album by American country music group The Forester Sisters. It was released in 1985 (see 1985 in country music) on Warner Bros. Records. The lead-off single, "(That's What You Do) When You're in Love", peaked at No. 10 on the Billboard country chart. It was followed by three consecutive number-one hits: "I Fell in Love Again Last Night", "Just in Case", and "Mama's Never Seen Those Eyes".

"Just in Case" was originally recorded by Exile on their 1984 album Kentucky Hearts. "Dixie Man" was originally recorded by Randy Barlow on his 1981 album Dimensions.

== Track listing ==
The Forester Sisters track listing
No.	Title	Writer(s)	Length
1.	"(That's What You Do) When You're in Love"	Kenneth Bell · Terry Skinner · J. L. Wallace	3:05
2.	"I Fell in Love Again Last Night"	Paul Overstreet; Thom Schuyler	3:12
3.	"Just in Case"	J.P. Pennington; Sonny LeMaire	2:27
4.	"Reckless Night"	Alice Randall; Mark D. Sanders	3:25
5.	"Dixie Man"	Bell; Skinner; Wallace	2:49
6.	"Mama's Never Seen Those Eyes"	Skinner; Wallace	2:50
7.	"The Missing Part"	Overstreet; Don Schlitz	3:23
8.	"Something Tells Me"	Chris Waters; Tom Shapiro	2:54
9.	"Crazy Heart"	Rick Giles; Steve Bogard	3:04
10.	"Yankee Don't Go Home"	Bobby Keel; Billy Stone	4:06
Total length:			31:15

== Personnel ==
=== The Forester Sisters ===
- Christy Forester – vocals
- June Forester – vocals
- Kathy Forester – vocals
- Kim Forester – vocals

=== Musicians ===
- Steve Nathan – keyboards
- J.L. Wallace – keyboards, acoustic guitar, electric guitars
- Ken Bell – acoustic guitar, electric guitars
- Will McFarlane – acoustic guitar
- John Willis – acoustic guitar
- Sonny Garrish – steel guitar
- Hoot Hester – fiddle, mandolin
- Lonnie "Butch" Ledford – bass guitar
- Owen Hale – drums

=== Production ===
- Terry Skinner – producer
- J.L. Wallace – producer
- Steve Melton – recording, mixing
- Alan Schulman – recording
- George Clinton – recording assistant
- Paul Mann – recording assistant
- Steve Moore – recording assistant
- Jerell Sockwell – mix assistant
- Glenn Meadows – mastering at Masterfonics (Nashville, Tennessee)
- Paige Rowden – production coordinator
- Gabrielle Raumberger – art direction, design
- Alan Messer – photography

== Chart performance ==
Chart (1985)	Peak position
US Top Country Albums (Billboard)	4
