= Brenda Lee Sings Top Teen Hits =

Studio album by Brenda Lee
- Released: February 15, 1965
- Recorded: September–October 1964
- Studios: Columbia, Nashville, Tennessee; Decca #2 Studio
- Genres: Nashville Sound; pop; rock
- Label: Decca
- Producers: Owen Bradley; Mickie Most

Brenda Lee chronology
Merry Christmas from Brenda Lee (1964)	Brenda Lee Sings Top Teen Hits (1965)	The Versatile Brenda Lee (1965)

Singles from Brenda Lee Sings Top Teen Hits
- 1. "When You Loved Me" Released: September 1964; 2. "Is It True" Released: October 1964; 3. "Thanks a Lot" Released: January 1965

Brenda Lee Sings Top Teen Hits is the twelfth studio album by American singer Brenda Lee. It was released by Decca Records on February 15, 1965, and contained 12 tracks. The album mostly featured songs made popular during the era in which it was released. Three additional songs were new recordings which were singles for Lee: "When You Loved Me", "Is It True" and "Thanks a Lot". Of its three singles, "Is It True" made the top 20 in the US and the UK. The album was met with positive reviews upon its release.

== Background ==
Brenda Lee became a commercial success as a teen recording country music and rock and roll during the 1950s. In the 1960s, Lee had further success recording pop material with songs like "I'm Sorry", "I Want to Be Wanted" and "Break It to Me Gently". These recordings reached the top ten and number one on the record charts through 1963. By 1964, Lee's singles only reached the US top 20 but were still met with a larger record-buying popularity in Europe. Among her top 20 recordings during this period was "Is It True". The song would be featured on Brenda Lee Sings Top Teen Hits.

== Recording and content ==
The album was compiled from recording sessions held at the Columbia Studio in Nashville, Tennessee in sessions produced by Owen Bradley. It also one recording ("Is It True") produced with Mickie Most at the Decca #2 Studio in London, England. The album consisted of 12 tracks. A majority of the album contained songs made popular by other recording artists from the era. This included "Dancing in the Street", "Can't Buy Me Love", "Wishin' and Hopin'" and "Funny How Time Slips Away". Three of these songs were originals that were Lee's singles from 1964 and 1965: "Is It True", "Thanks a Lot" and "When You Loved Me".

== Release and critical reception ==
Brenda Lee Sings Top Teen Hits was released by Decca Records on February 15, 1965. It was distributed as a vinyl LP, with six sides on each side of the record. It was Lee's eleventh studio album in her career. Top Teen Hits was one of the first Decca albums issued in Brazil. This did not occur until 1966. The album was given positive reviews from critics upon its release. Billboard gave it a positive response: "A dozen top teen hits of the past are given the inimitable Lee styling and the result is a powerful package of good material and exceptional performances." Record World also praised the record: "Label has a winning album with their best bet songstress reprising some of the hits of the past year, including a couple of her own."

== Singles ==
Three singles were included on Brenda Lee Sings Top Teen Hits. "When You Loved Me" was the first single released in August 1964. It reached number 47 on the US Hot 100 and number nine on the US adult contemporary chart. "Is It True" was the album's most successful single, peaking at number 17 on both the US Hot 100 and the UK Singles Chart. It was her second-highest-charting single on Canada's RPM Top Singles chart, peaking at number eight. The third single was "Thanks a Lot", issued by Decca in January 1965. The song only reached the top 50 in both the US and the UK. In Canada, it reached the number 14 position.

== Track listing ==
Side one
No.	Title	Writer(s)	Length
1.	"Dancing in the Street"	Marvin Gaye; William "Mickey" Stevenson; Ivy Jo Hunter	2:39
2.	"The Crying Game"	Geoff Stephens	2:38
3.	"Thanks a Lot"	Eddie Miller; Don Sessions	2:37
4.	"Let It Be Me"	Gilbert Bécaud; Manny Curtis; Pierre Delanoë	3:04
5.	"He Loves You"	Lennon–McCartney	2:21
6.	"Snap Your Fingers"	Grady Martin; Alex Zanetis	2:54

Side two
No.	Title	Writer(s)	Length
1.	"Wishin' and Hopin'"	Burt Bacharach; Hal David	2:54
2.	"Funny How Time Slips Away"	Willie Nelson	3:00
3.	"Is It True"	Carter & Lewis	2:20
4.	"(There's) Always Something There to Remind Me"	Bacharach; David	2:45
5.	"Can't Buy Me Love"	Lennon–McCartney	2:06
6.	"When You Loved Me"	Joy Byers; Bob Tubert	2:14

== Personnel ==
All credits are adapted from the liner notes of Brenda Lee Sings Top Teen Hits.

- Owen Bradley – Producer
- Hal Buksbaum – Photography
- Mickie Most – Producer (Side 2, Track 3)
- Don Richardson Sr. – Liner Notes

== Release history ==
Region	Date	Format	Label	Ref.
Australia	February 15, 1965	Vinyl LP (Mono)	Festival Records	
Germany	February 15, 1965	Vinyl LP (Stereo)	Brunswick Records	
Israel	February 15, 1965	Vinyl LP (Stereo)	Arton Records	
North America	February 15, 1965	Vinyl LP (Mono); Vinyl LP (Stereo)	Decca Records	
United Kingdom	February 15, 1965	Vinyl LP (Mono); Vinyl LP (Stereo)	Brunswick Records	
Brazil	January 1966	Vinyl LP (Mono)	Decca Records	
