= Sunshine Girl (Moumoon song) =

- Cover featuring model Yū Aoi

Single by Moumoon

from the album Spark and 15 Doors
- B-side: "Medley (2010 Summer Ver)"
- Released: May 12, 2010
- Genre: J-pop
- Length: 3:51
- Label: Avex
- Songwriters: Yuka, K. Masaki
- Producer: Moumoon

Moumoon singles chronology
"Aoi Tsuki to Ambivalence na Ai" (2009)	"Sunshine Girl" (2010)	"Let's Dance in the Moonlight" (2010)

"Sunshine Girl" is Japanese band Moumoon's 8th single, released on May 12, 2010. It achieved success after a high-profile commercial campaign for Shiseido's Anessa range of sunblock cosmetics. It is currently Moumoon's only top 10 single, and their most successful single in terms of physical copies sold and digital certifications (it is the only Moumoon song to receive a certification by the RIAJ).

An English-language version with the same arrangement was released on the group's EP Spark later in 2010.

== Promotion ==
The song was first unveiled in Shiseido commercial campaign for Anessa, starting on March 19. The song was also later used in commercials for Sony Ericsson's Xperia smartphones, and was one of the songs used in Sony's bid for the Guinness World Records' award for greatest number of different commercials played in a single television show selling the same product.

The song was performed at Music Station on July 30.

== Track listing ==
All tracks are written by Yuka, K. Masaki.

No.	Title	Length
1.	"Sunshine Girl"	3:51
2.	"Medley (2010 Sumer Ver.)" (メドレー Medorē)	3:37
3.	"Sunshine Girl (Instrumental)"	3:51
Total length:		11:17

== Chart rankings and certifications ==
"Sunshine Girl"
A sample of the chorus of "Sunshine Girl."

Weekly chart performance
Chart	Peak position
Billboard Adult Contemporary Airplay	5
Billboard Japan Hot 100	4
Billboard yearly Japan Hot 100	41
Oricon weekly singles	10
RIAJ Digital Track Chart weekly top 100	1
RIAJ Digital Track Chart yearly top 100	41

Annual chart rankings
Chart (2010)	Rank
Japan Adult Contemporary (Billboard Japan)	23

=== Sales and certifications ===
Chart	Amount
Oricon physical sales	36,000
RIAJ ringtone downloads	500,000+ (2× Platinum)
RIAJ full-length cellphone downloads	250,000+ (Platinum)

== Release history ==
Region	Date	Format
Japan	April 26, 2010	Ringtone
Japan	May 12, 2010	CD, rental CD
Japan	June 30, 2010	Cellphone digital download
Japan	July 7, 2010	PC download
