= Men (The Forester Sisters song) =

Single by The Forester Sisters

from the album Talkin' 'Bout Men
- B-side: "Just in Case"
- Released: January 26, 1991
- Genre: Country
- Length: 3:21
- Label: Warner Bros. Nashville
- Songwriters: Robert Byrne, Alan Schulman
- Producers: Robert Byrne, Alan Schulman

The Forester Sisters singles chronology
"Old Enough to Know" (1990)	"Men" (1991)	"Too Much Fun" (1991)

"Men" is a song written by Robert Byrne and Alan Schulman and recorded by American country music group The Forester Sisters. It was released in 1991 as the first single and partial title track from the album Talkin' 'Bout Men. The song reached number 8 on the Billboard Hot Country Singles & Tracks chart. "Men" was the Forester Sisters' last top-40 country hit; like a number of other 1980s country acts, the band fell in popularity dramatically in 1991 along with a major change in the country music landscape.

== Content ==
The song describes a love-hate relationship with the male half of the human species, noting both their positive contributions (ranging from the courtesy of opening doors to ensuring the survival of the species) and the frustrating aspects of their behavior.

== Parodies ==
The Bandit Brothers, a studio band assembled by producers John Range and Karl Shannon, recorded a parody of the song called "Women". It was released as a single by Curb Records and peaked at number 57 on the Billboard Hot Country Singles & Tracks chart.

== Chart performance ==
Chart (1991)	Peak position
Canada Country Singles (RPM)	14
US Hot Country Songs (Billboard)	8

== Usage in media ==
- A section of the song, accompanied by an progressively distorted sample of a speaker at a pro-choice rally from the 1990s, was used as the "Feminist Update" theme on The Rush Limbaugh Show.
