= Truly, Truly True =

Single by Brenda Lee

from the album The Versatile Brenda Lee
- B-side: "I Still Miss Someone"
- Released: March 1965
- Genre: Pop
- Length: 2:40
- Label: Decca 31762
- Songwriters: Dalibor Basler, Vladimir Rohlena, Al Stillman, Arthur Altman

Brenda Lee singles chronology
"Thanks a Lot" (1965)	"Truly, Truly True" (1965)	"Too Many Rivers" (1965)

"Truly, Truly True" is a song written by Dalibor Basler, Vladimir Rohlena, Al Stillman, and Arthur Altman and performed by Brenda Lee. The song reached #9 on the adult contemporary chart and #54 on the Billboard Hot 100 in 1965. It was featured on her 1965 album, The Versatile Brenda Lee.

The song was arranged by Owen Bradley.
