= Alone with You (Brenda Lee song) =

Single by Brenda Lee
- B-side: "My Dreams"
- Released: June 1964
- Genre: Pop
- Length: 2:33
- Label: Decca 31628
- Songwriter(s): Jackie DeShannon

Brenda Lee singles chronology
"Think" (1964)	"Alone with You" (1964)	"When You Loved Me" (1964)

"Alone with You" is a song written by Jackie DeShannon and performed by Brenda Lee. The song reached #8 on the adult contemporary chart and #48 on the Billboard Hot 100 in 1964. It also reached #32 in Canada.

The single's B-side, "My Dreams", reached #85 on the Billboard Hot 100.
