= (My Baby Don't Love Me) No More =

1954 song

Song by The DeJohn Sisters
- Published: 1954
- Label: Epic
- Songwriters: Julie De John, Dux De John
- Composer: Leo J. De John

(My Baby Don't Love Me) No More" is a popular song.

The music was written by Leo J. De John, the lyrics by his sisters Julie De John and Dux De John. The song was published in 1954.

The best-selling version was recorded by The De John Sisters (both credited as lyricists) in 1954; a recording was also made by The McGuire Sisters the same year. Both hit the Billboard magazine charts.

The recording by The De John Sisters was released by Epic Records as catalog number 9085. It first reached the Billboard magazine Best Seller chart on December 22, 1954, and lasted 10 weeks on the chart, peaking at #8. It reached #6 on the Billboard Jockey charts.

The recording by The McGuire Sisters was released by Coral Records as catalog number 61323. It first reached the Billboard magazine Best Seller chart on January 19, 1955, and lasted 6 weeks on the chart, peaking at #23. The flip side of this recording was the bigger (#1) hit "Sincerely." In the UK, No More peaked at #20, and was covered by Billie Anthony.
