= The Moonglows =

American R&B group

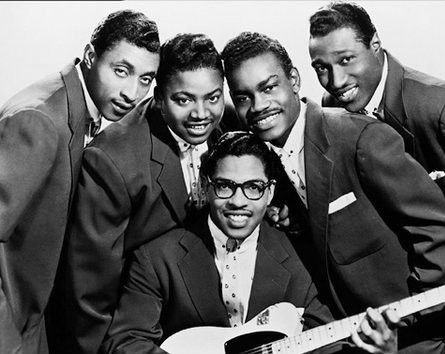
- The Moonglows in 1956

Background information
- Origin: Cleveland, Ohio, United States
- Genres: R&B, doo-wop
- Years active: 1951–1960, 1964–1968, 1971–1972, 1979–1980,1983-1986, 1990s–2000s
- Labels: Champaign, Chance, Chess, RCA
- Past members: Harvey Fuqua; Bobby Lester; Pete Graves; Prentiss Barnes; Billy Johnson; Marvin Gaye; Danny Coggins; Chuck Barksdale: James Nolan; Reese Palmer; Chester Simmons; Peter Crawford; Bruce Martin; Gene Kelley; Gary Rodgers Sr.; Johnny L. Franklin; Chuck Lewis; Doc Williams; Robert Ford; Billy McPhatter; Bobby Lester Jr.; Milton Turner; Bearle Easton; George Thorpe

The Moonglows, "I Knew from the Start", 1956

The Moonglows, "Over and Over Again", 1956

The Moonglows were an American R&B group in the 1950s. Their song "Sincerely" went to number 1 on the Billboard R&B chart and number 20 on the Billboard Juke Box chart.

They were inducted into the Rock and Roll Hall of Fame in 2000.

== Career ==
=== Early years ===
Fresh from a stint in the U.S. Army, two friends, Harvey Fuqua and Bobby Lester, formed a duo in 1949 in Louisville, Kentucky, United States. In 1951, Fuqua moved to Cleveland and formed the Crazy Sounds with the singers Danny Coggins and Prentiss Barnes. Lester joined them later.

In 1952, while performing at a Cleveland club, the Crazy Sounds auditioned for the club's management. They soon got in contact with the radio host Alan Freed, who upon hearing them became the group's manager. Freed renamed the group the Moonglows, after his own nickname, Moondog. They signed with Freed's Champagne label, but their recordings for the label failed to make the charts. Coggins left the group and was replaced by Alexander Walton, who was sometimes known as Pete Graves or Pete Walton.

In 1953, they recorded for another small label, Chance, but like their Champagne recordings, their records had little success; their cover of Doris Day's "Secret Love" was their most successful for Chance. In September 1953, Freed obtained a contract with the New York radio station WINS. His success as a broadcaster and host of the station led to a contract for the Moonglows with Chess Records.

=== Success ===
Their first Chess single, "Sincerely", led by Lester, reached number one on the Billboard R&B chart and the top 20 of the pop chart. The song was later a crossover success in a cover version by the McGuire Sisters. In 1955, the band picked the guitarist Billy Johnson to be their fifth member after Wayne Bennett left the group following their engagement at the Apollo Theater. That same year, the group had another R&B hit with "Most of All", followed by a more modest success with "We Go Together" in 1956. Chess issued some of their recordings with the group credited as the Moonlighters.

For most of the Moonglows' tenure, the lead vocals were split between Lester and Fuqua. Lester preferred doo-wop ballads, whereas Fuqua preferred rock-and-roll songs. The two also recorded vocal duets. Their next hits, in 1956, included "See Saw", which peaked at number five R&B and number 25 on the Billboard Top 100, and "When I'm with You", which reached number 15 on the R&B chart. In August 1956, the band appeared in one of the first rock-and-roll movies, Rock, Rock, Rock, lip-syncing "Over and Over Again" and "I Knew From The Start".

By December 1956, Fuqua had begun to sing most of the vocal leads. In June 1957, the Moonglows had an R&B hit with their cover of Percy Mayfield's "Please Send Me Someone to Love". In late 1958, the Fuqua-led "Ten Commandments of Love" (used in soundtrack of "A Bronx Tale") reached number nine R&B and number 22 pop; the group was billed as Harvey and the Moonglows. Chess released two EPs and an album, Look, It's the Moonglows, during that period. Following that release, the original group broke up at the end of the year, performing together only for contractual reasons.

=== Spinoff groups ===
In 1959, Lester began a solo career. That same year, Harvey Fuqua, following the advice of another Chess artist, Bo Diddley, worked with the Marquees, where Fuqua first met Marvin Gaye. Relocating the group from their hometown of Washington, D.C., to Chicago, Fuqua soon brought Chuck Barksdale into the group after Barksdale's group, the Dells, was temporarily on a break following a car crash involving one of its members. Fuqua renamed the group Harvey and the New Moonglows. In April 1959, Fuqua sang lead on the ballad "Twelve Months of the Year", which included a spoken recitation by Gaye, repeating an early trademark of the Moonglows in "Ten Commandments of Love". Later in 1959, Chess issued the songs "Unemployment" and "Mama Loocie", which was Gaye's first lead vocal. Most of the time, Fuqua recorded solo numbers and often promoted his and the New Moonglows' songs on TV and in movies. During this time, the group recorded background vocals for the likes of Etta James and Chuck Berry.

Lester later formed his own Moonglows group. In 1959, he made headlines after he was arrested on a narcotics charge in Beaumont, Texas. In early 1960, James Nolan left Fuqua's group, as did Reese Palmer. According to Palmer, they left to raise their families. Chuck Barksdale also left to rejoin the revived Dells. In late 1960, Gaye, Chester Simmons and Fuqua recorded (along with, presumably, members of the Spinners) the last New Moonglows recordings, including "Junior" and "Beatnik". Afterwards, Gaye relocated to Detroit and later signed with Tamla, a subsidiary of Motown Records. In February 1961, Fuqua left Chess and worked on his own Detroit labels, Harvey and Tri-Phi, until he joined Motown's production team. He left Motown for RCA in 1970. In 1969, Prentiss Barnes retired from show business after complications of injuries from a car crash.

=== Reunion ===
In 1970, Harvey Fuqua, Bobby Lester and Pete Graves reunited as the Moonglows with Doc Williams and Chuck Lewis. In 1972, they recorded "Sincerely '72" for Big P Records. RCA soon bought Big P and reissued "Sincerely '72", which reached number 43 on the R&B chart. The album The Return of the Moonglows was also released that year. The reunion proved to be short-lived.

=== Final years and deaths ===
Danny Coggins died on July 27, 1972, due to a heart attack.

Bobby Lester continued to sing lead for his own Moonglows group until he succumbed to complications of cancer in 1980, at the age of 49. He was replaced by Billy McPhatter, son of Clyde McPhatter.

Fuqua performed with Bobby Lester's Moonglows at the 1983 Grammy Awards ceremony, and the group toured as Harvey and the Moonglows until 1986. Bobby Lester, Jr., replaced McPhatter as lead singer of Bobby Lester's Moonglows.

They also performed at Doo Wop 50, where they sang "Sincerely" and "Ten Commandments of Love". The line-up was Harvey Fuqua, Bruce Martin, Gene Kelley, Peter Crawford, and Gary Rodgers.

Billy Johnson died in Los Angeles on April 28, 1987.

Chester Simmons died on September 26, 1988.

Johnny L. Franklin died on December 14, 1991.

Gary Rodgers died on June 25, 2005.

Gene Kelley died in 2008.

Reese Palmer died on October 27, 2011.

Prentiss Barnes and Pete Graves both died in 2006. Fuqua, the last surviving original member of the group, died on July 6, 2010, in Detroit.

== Legacy ==
The Moonglows' singing style is known as "blow" harmony, based on the technical method used by the backing vocalists.

The Moonglows were inducted into the Vocal Group Hall of Fame in 1999 and the Rock & Roll Hall of Fame in 2000.

The group are mentioned in Paul Simon's 1983 song "René and Georgette Magritte with Their Dog after the War".

== Members ==
- Harvey Fuqua, vocals (1953–1958)
- Bobby Lester, vocals (1953–1958)
- Alexander "Pete" Walton (or Graves), vocals (1953–1958)
- Prentiss Barnes, vocals (1953–1958)
- Billy Johnson, guitar (1953–1958)
- Danny Coggins, vocals (1953)

== Discography ==
=== Albums ===
==== Studio albums ====
- Look! It's The Moonglows (1958)
- The Return Of The Moonglows (1972) (No. 193 US)

==== Compilations ====
- Rock, Rock, Rock! (1956)
- Bunch Of Goodies (1960)
- The Best Of Bobby Lester And The Moonglows (1962)
- The Flamingos Meet The Moonglows On The Dusty Road Of Hits (1962)
- The Moonglows Greatest Hits (1973)
- Moonglows (1976)

=== Singles ===
Year	Single (A-side, B-side) Both sides from same album except where indicated	Chart positions		Album
Year	Single (A-side, B-side) Both sides from same album except where indicated	US	US R&B	Album
1953	"Just a Lonely Christmas" b/w "Hey, Santa Claus"	—	—	Non-album tracks
1954	"Secret Love" b/w "Real Gone Mama"	—	—	Non-album tracks
1954	"I Was Wrong" b/w "Ooo Rockin' Daddy"	—	—	Non-album tracks
1954	"219 Train" b/w "My Gal"	—	—	Non-album tracks
1954	"Sincerely" b/w "Tempting" (Non-album track)	20	1	"Rock, Rock, Rock" soundtrack
1955	"Most Of All" b/w "She's Gone" (Non-album track)	—	5	Bunch of Goodies
1955	"Starlite" b/w "In Love"	—	—	Non-album tracks
1955	"Lover, Love Me" b/w "In My Diary" (from Bunch of Goodies)	—	—	Non-album tracks
1956	"We Go Together" b/w "Chickie Um Bah" (Non-album track)	—	9	Bunch of Goodies
1956	"When I'm With You" /	—	15	Look! It's The Moonglows
1956	"See Saw"	25	6	"Rock, Rock, Rock" soundtrack
1956	"Over and Over Again" b/w "I Knew From The Start"	—	—	"Rock, Rock, Rock" soundtrack
1957	"Don't Say Goodbye" b/w "I'm Afraid The Masquerade Is Over" (Non-album track)	—	-	Look! It's The Moonglows
1957	"Please Send Me Someone to Love" b/w "Mr. Engineer (Bring Her Back To Me)" (Non-album track)	73	5	Bunch of Goodies
1957	"The Beating Of My Heart" b/w "Confess It To Your Heart"	—	—	Non-album tracks
1958	"Here I Am" b/w "Too Late"	—	—	Non-album tracks
1958	"In the Middle of the Night" b/w "Soda Pop"	—	—	Non-album tracks
1958	"Ten Commandments of Love" b/w "Mean Old Blues"	22	9	Look! It's The Moonglows
1959	"Mama Loocie" b/w "Unemployment"	—	—	Non-album tracks
1972	"Sincerely" b/w "I Was Wrong"	—	43	The Return Of The Moonglows
