= It's You Again =

It's You Again may refer to:

- It's You Again (Skip Ewing song)
- It's You Again (Exile song)

== See also ==
- You Again (disambiguation)
