= McGuffey Lane =

American country rock band

- Origin: Athens, Ohio, United States
- Genre: Country rock
- Years active: 1972–present
- Labels: Atco; Atlantic; HCH Lick
- Members: Terry Efaw; Steve Reis; John Schwab; Randy Huff; Molly Pauken; Kevin Reed
- Past members: Joe Pate; Bobby Gene McNelley; Tebes Douglass

McGuffey Lane is an American country rock band from Athens, Ohio, and/or Columbus, Ohio, United States. The group was formed in 1972 by Terry Efaw and Steve Reis, who played together under the name Scotch & Soda. After adding songwriter, lead singer, and guitarist Bobby E. McNelley, they branded themselves McGuffey Lane, the location of Reis's Athens, Ohio, home.

The band eventually expanded to a sextet and became well known locally, releasing their first album on their own Paradise Island record label. The LP sold more than 40,000 copies, and eventually resulted in their signing with Atco Records. They reissued the debut in 1980 and toured with the Charlie Daniels Band, The Judds, and the Allman Brothers Band. The follow-up, Aqua Dream, featured the single "Start It All Over", which spent three weeks on the Billboard Hot 100, peaking at number 97 in February 1982.

The group scored several minor hits on the country charts, but their label wanted to market them more as a pop-country act in the vein of Alabama. They moved to Atlantic Records to focus more on country chart success, but as they prepared 1984's Day By Day, keyboardist Tebes Douglass was killed in a car crash. Soon after, Bobby Gene McNelley left the group to pursue a solo career as a songwriter in Nashville, Tennessee. In 1985, McGuffey Lane was dropped from Atlantic. In 1986, they released a Christmas album in support of the Central Ohio Lung Association; toward the end of that year, they inked a sponsorship with Miller Beer, but a planned comeback fizzled.

The group played into the late 1980s but had dissolved by 1990. In 1995, they reunited after releasing a greatest hits album, and continued performing locally in Ohio into the 2000s. Two full-length releases followed the reunion, in 1998 and 2002. On August 18, 2009, they opened for Lynyrd Skynyrd at The LC in Columbus, Ohio. In March 2010, Lick Records signed a distribution deal with E1 Entertainment, which allows the new McGuffey Lane album to be sold in Wal-Mart and Best Buy.

== Zachariah's Red Eye Reunion ==
Every January, McGuffey Lane holds an annual reunion concert featuring many acts who also played at Zachariah's Red Eye Saloon. The first two reunions were held at Villa Milano Banquet and Conference Center, located on Schrock Road on the northeast side of Columbus, Ohio. After the initial two events, John Schwab (who is the organizer of the event) started looking for a larger venue to host the reunion concert, as it had outgrown Villa Milano. He settled on Lifestyles Communities Pavilion (now KEMBA Live!). The 2013 Reunion currently holds the indoor attendance record at the LC. The fourteenth anniversary took place on January 25, 2014.

Some acts who have taken part in the event are: Rob McNelly (son of original lead singer Bobby Gene McNelly and current guitarist for Bob Seger and The Silver Bullet Band), John David Call (steel guitarist for Pure Prairie League), Steve Smith, Gary Ballen, Delyn Christian, Tom Ingham, the Dan Orr Project, Cliff Cody, Grassanine, and Erica Blinn.

== Members ==
- Terry Efaw – Steel guitar, gutstring guitar, electric guitar
- Steve Reis – Bass, vocals
- Molly Pauken- Mandolin, acoustic guitar, vocals
- Randy Huff – Drums, vocals
- Kevin Reed- Harmonica, vocals
- John Schwab – Lead guitar, lead vocals
- Mike Nugen – Lead guitar, vocals(select dates)

== Former members ==
- Bobby Gene McNelly – Lead vocals, acoustic guitar
- Stephen "Tebes" Douglass – Keyboards, harmonica, vocals
- Dick Smith – Drums, guitar, vocals
- Dave Rangeler – Drums, vocals
- Tom Ingham – Acoustic guitar, harmonica, vocals
- Delyn Christian – Harmonica, vocals
- Casey McKeown – Keyboards
- Craig Goodwin – Acoustic guitar, vocals
- John Campigotto – Drums, vocals
- Dave Robins – Saxophone
- Joe Pate – Drums, also batman
- Tammy Walkup- Backing vocals

== Discography ==
=== Albums ===
Year	Title	Chart positions		Label
Year	Title	US Country	US	Label
1980	McGuffey Lane			Atco
1980	The First Album			Atco
1980	Aqua Dream		193	Atco
1983	Let the Hard Times Roll	61		Atco
1984	Day by Day	56		Atlantic
1986	McGuffey Lane Christmas			HCH
1995	Greatest Hits Live and More			HCH
1998	Call Me Lucky			Lick
2002	Wood			Lick
2010	10			Lick
2017	Legend Of The Red Eye			Lick

=== Singles ===
Year	Title	Chart positions		Album
Year	Title	US Country	US	Album
1981	"Long Time Lovin' You"		85	Single only
1982	"Start It All Over"		97	Aqua Dream
1982	"Making a Living's Been Killing Me"	44		Let the Hard Times Roll
1983	"Doing It Right"	62		Let the Hard Times Roll
1984	"Day by Day"	44		Day by Day
1984	"The First Time"	63		Day by Day
2011	"Bartender"			10

== Album listings ==
McGuffey Lane

1. People Like You
2. Long Time Lovin' You
3. Ain't No One (To Love You Like I Do)
4. Let Me Take You To The Rodeo
5. Green Country Mountains
6. Stagecoach
7. Music Man
8. Breakaway
9. Lady Autumn
10. Stay In Love With You

Aqua Dream

1. New Beginning
2. It Comes From The Heart
3. Dream About You
4. Tennessee
5. Don't You Think About Me (When I'm Gone)
6. Start It All Over
7. Fair Weather Friends
8. Fallin' Timber
9. Bag Of Rags: Black Mountain Rag /Tiger Rag /12th Street Rag(featuring a guest appearance by Charlie Daniels)
10. Outlaw Rider

Let The Hard Times Roll

1. Let the Hard Times Toll
2. Raining Inside and Out
3. If I Didn't Love You
4. Too Many Days
5. Making a Living's Been Killing Me
6. Doing It Right
7. Sunshine
8. You Wouldn't Give Up on Me
9. If You Were Mine
10. Never Say Forever

Day By Day

1. Day by Day
2. Keep Me Hangin' On
3. First Time
4. You've Got a Right
5. Lorianne
6. What'll You Do About Me
7. Wasted Love
8. Jamaica in My Mind
9. Hold on to the Night
10. The Legend

Greatest Hits, Live, and More

1. Ain't Life Funny
2. People Like You
3. Ain't No One (To Love You Like I Do)
4. Do You Think (We'll Ever Fall In Love)
5. Diana Might
6. Outlaw Rider
7. Let's Hold on to the Night
8. Long Time Lovin' You
9. Be a Friend of Mine
10. Green Country Mountains
11. The Legend
12. Rock 'n' Roll (Will Keep You Young)
13. A New Beginning(Demo)
14. Leavin' It All Behind(Demo)
15. Black Mountain Rag(Demo)

Call Me Lucky

1. Kid with the Arrow
2. The Good in Goodbye
3. There's Only One of Us Now
4. When I Sing of You
5. What You've Got
6. Trains Make Me Lonesome
7. Call Me Lucky
8. Baby Don't Call Me Baby (Anymore)
9. Into the Mystic
10. The Good Times Tonight

Wood

1. Old Taylor
2. Steady As She Goes
3. Don't You Think About Me
4. Railroad Song
5. First Time
6. It Takes Time
7. Let's Go
8. On the Line
9. Runnin' Wild & Free
10. Lady Autumn
11. Nobody But a Fool
12. Cumberland Gap
13. 'Til the End
14. The Omen

10

1. I Am Who I Am
2. Bartender
3. It's A Good Day
4. You're The One
5. Lucky Guy
6. Done With The Devil
7. I Ain't Giving In To Getting Old
8. Nobody But A Fool
9. Song For The Road
10. Runnin' Blind

Zachariah's Red Eye Reunion DVD

1. The Railroad Song
2. Don't you think about me (when I'm gone)
3. The Boys a Dancer
4. Wild and Free
5. Breakaway
6. Tennessee*
7. Stagecoach*
8. Stay (in love with you*
9. Rasputin
10. Outlaw Rider
11. On the Line
12. Rodeo*
13. People Like You*
14. Ain't no one*
15. Green Country Mountain*
16. Long Time Loving You*
17. "Backstage Pass"(video interviews backstage)
18. "Rock Of Ages" (Music video from 1990)
19. "Bert" music video from 1994)and 'The First Time" (music video from 1983)
- Featuring Rob McNelly, son of former lead singer Bobby Gene McNelly
