= No One (Connie Francis song) =

1960 Connie Francis song

Single by Connie Francis
- A-side: "Where the Boys Are"
- Released: January 1961 (US)
- Recorded: 1960
- Genre: Pop; easy listening
- Label: MGM
- Songwriters: Doc Pomus; Mort Shuman

Connie Francis singles chronology
"No One" (1961)	"Breakin' in a Brand New Broken Heart" (1961)

Audio
- "No One" on YouTube

"No One"

Single by Ray Charles
- B-side: "Without Love (There is Nothing)"
- Released: June 1963 (US)
- Genre: Pop; easy listening
- Label: ABC-Paramount
- Songwriters: Doc Pomus; Mort Shuman

Ray Charles singles chronology
"Take These Chains from My Heart" (1963)	"No One" (1963)	"Without Love (There is Nothing)" (1963)

"No One"

Single by Brenda Lee
- A-side: "Too Many Rivers"
- Released: May 17, 1965 (US)
- Genre: Pop; easy listening
- Label: Decca
- Songwriters: Doc Pomus; Mort Shuman

Brenda Lee singles chronology
"Too Many Rivers" (1965)	"No One" (1965)	"Rusty Bells" (1965)

"No One" is a song originally recorded by American singer and actress Connie Francis in 1960. It was released by MGM Records as the B-side of her bigger hit, "Where the Boys Are", but charted separately. The song reached number 34 on the US Billboard Hot 100 during the winter of 1961.

== Ray Charles cover ==
The most successful version of "No One" was recorded by American singer, songwriter, and pianist Ray Charles in 1963. His version was released in June 1963 by ABC-Paramount and peaked at number 21 on the US Billboard Hot 100 and became a Top 10 R&B and AC hit. It also charted in the United Kingdom, reaching number 35.

== Brenda Lee cover ==
In 1965, American singer Brenda Lee covered "No One", with chorus and orchestra directed by Owen Bradley. It was released in May 1965 by Decca Records as an A-side, however, it was backed with "Too Many Rivers", which became the bigger hit (number 13). Her rendition reached only number 98 on the US Billboard Hot 100. Nevertheless, it also reached #25 on the US Billboard Easy Listening chart, and was the only version of the song to chart in Canada, where it became a Top 40 hit (number 36).

== Charts ==
Connie Francis

Chart (1961)	Peak position
US Billboard Hot 100	34
US Record World 100 Top Pops	52
US Cash Box Top 100	63

Ray Charles

Chart (1963)	Peak position
UK Singles (OCC)	35
US Billboard Hot 100	21
US Adult Contemporary (Billboard)	6
US Hot R&B (Billboard)	9
US Cash Box Top 100	22

Brenda Lee

Chart (1965)	Peak position
Canada Top Singles (RPM)	36
US Billboard Hot 100	98
US Adult Contemporary (Billboard)	25
US Cash Box Top 100	95
