= Letter Home =

Single by The Forester Sisters

from the album Sincerely
- B-side: "These Lips Don't Know How to Say Goodbye"
- Released: June 25, 1988
- Genre: Country
- Length: 3:39
- Label: Warner Bros. Nashville
- Songwriter(s): Wendy Waldman
- Producer(s): Wendy Waldman

The Forester Sisters singles chronology
| "Lyin' in His Arms Again" (1987) | "Letter Home" (1988) | "Sincerely" (1988) |

"Letter Home" is a song written and recorded by Wendy Waldman for her 1987 studio album Letters Home. In 1988, it was recorded by American country music group The Forester Sisters and released in June 1988 as the first single from the album Sincerely. The song reached number 9 on the Billboard Hot Country Singles & Tracks chart.

== Charts ==
=== Weekly charts ===
| Chart (1988) | Peak position |
|---|---|
| US Hot Country Songs (Billboard) | 9 |
| Canadian RPM Country Tracks | 7 |

=== Year-end charts ===
| Chart (1988) | Position |
|---|---|
| US Hot Country Songs (Billboard) | 78 |
