= Love Will (song) =

Single by The Forester Sisters

from the album Sincerely
- B-side: "You Love Me"
- Released: February 18, 1989
- Genre: Country
- Length: 3:35
- Label: Warner Bros. Nashville
- Songwriters: Don Pfrimmer, Byron Gallimore
- Producers: James Stroud, Barry Beckett

The Forester Sisters singles chronology
| "Sincerely" (1988) | "Love Will" (1989) | "Don't You" (1989) |

"Love Will" is a song written by Don Pfrimmer and Byron Gallimore, and recorded by American country music group The Forester Sisters. It was released in February 1989 as the third single from the album Sincerely. The song reached number 7 on the Billboard Hot Country Singles & Tracks chart.

== Chart performance ==
| Chart (1989) | Peak position |
|---|---|
| Canada Country Singles (RPM) | 20 |
| US Hot Country Songs (Billboard) | 7 |

=== Year-end charts ===
| Chart (1989) | Position |
|---|---|
| US Country Songs (Billboard) | 94 |
