= Perfume, Ribbons & Pearls =

Studio album by The Forester Sisters
- Released: 1986
- Studios: Muscle Shoals Sound Studios (Sheffield, Alabama); FAME Studios (Muscle Shoals, Alabama); Boutwell Recording Studios (Birmingham, Alabama); Studio 19 (Nashville, Tennessee).
- Genre: Country
- Length: 33:57
- Label: Warner Nashville
- Producers: Terry Skinner; J.L. Wallace

The Forester Sisters chronology
The Forester Sisters (1985)	Perfume, Ribbons & Pearls (1986)	You Again (1987)

Singles from Perfume, Ribbons & Pearls
- 1. "Lonely Alone" Released: July 5, 1986

Perfume, Ribbons & Pearls is the second studio album by American country music group The Forester Sisters. It was released via Warner Bros. Records Nashville in 1986.

== Content ==
Only one single was released from the album: "Lonely Alone", which charted at number 2 on Billboard Hot Country Songs in 1986.

== Critical reception ==
Cliff Radel of The Cincinnati Enquirer rated the album 2 out of 5 stars, calling the singing "clear as the sky on a crisp fall day" but criticizing the "poverty stricken songs". Montreal Gazette writer Lucinda Chodan contrasted the quartet's sound with that of The Judds, stating that "those celestial voices are harmonizing in the service of songs that, for the most part, are about as individual as pennies in a jar." She thought that "100% Chance of Blue" and the cover of The Supremes' "Back in My Arms Again" were the most distinct songs, but still criticized the production.

== Track listing ==
No.	Title	Writer(s)	Length
1.	"100% Chance of Blue"	Walt Aldridge; Tom Brasfield	3:51
2.	"Heartache Headed My Way"	Bob Morrison; Barbara Morrison	2:53
3.	"Back in My Arms Again"	Holland-Dozier-Holland	3:03
4.	"Somebody's Breakin' a Heart"	J. L. Wallace; Terry Skinner	3:22
5.	"That's Easy for You to Say"	Paul Harrison; Bob McDill	3:42
6.	"Blame It on the Moon"	Wallace; Skinner	2:50
7.	"Lonely Alone"	J.D. Martin; John Jarrard	3:29
8.	"Heartless Night"	Michael Bonagura; Craig Bickhardt	3:38
9.	"You Were the One"	Randy Albright	2:29
10.	"Drawn to the Fire"	Pam Tillis; Stan Webb	2:40
Total length:			33:57

== Personnel ==
=== The Forester Sisters ===
- Christy Forester – lead vocals (3), backing vocals
- June Forester – lead vocals (8), backing vocals
- Kathy Forester – lead vocals (1, 5, 6, 9), backing vocals
- Kim Forester – lead vocals (2, 4, 7, 10), backing vocals

=== Additional Musicians ===
- Steve Nathan – keyboards
- Ray Flacke – electric guitar
- Will McFarlane – acoustic guitar, electric guitar
- J.L. Wallace – electric guitar, string arrangements and conductor
- John Willis – acoustic guitar
- Sonny Garrish – steel guitar
- Lonnie "Butch" Ledford – bass guitar
- Owen Hale – drums
- Hoot Hester – fiddle
- The Birmingham Strings – strings

=== Production ===
- Terry Skinner – producer, recording assistant
- J.L. Wallace – producer
- Steve Melton – recording, mixing
- Billy Lynn – recording assistant
- Paul Mann – recording assistant
- Jerell Sockwell – recording assistant
- E.J. Walsh – recording assistant
- Marty Williams – recording assistant
- Jerry Masters – special string engineer
- Glenn Meadows – mastering at Masterfonics (Nashville, Tennessee)
- Paige Rowden – production coordinator
- Gabrielle Raumberger – art direction, design
- Kelly Ray – set design
- Steven Rothfeld – photography
- Gerald Roy and Stellar Entertainment – management

== Chart performance ==
Chart (1986)	Peak position
US Top Country Albums (Billboard)	27
