= Mama's Never Seen Those Eyes =

Single by The Forester Sisters

from the album The Forester Sisters
- B-side: "Something Tells Me"
- Released: March 15, 1986
- Genre: Country
- Length: 2:50
- Label: Warner Bros. Nashville
- Songwriter(s): Terry Skinner; J. L. Wallace
- Producer(s): Terry Skinner; J. L. Wallace

The Forester Sisters singles chronology
"Just in Case" (1986)	"Mama's Never Seen Those Eyes" (1986)	"Lonely Alone" (1986)

"Mama's Never Seen Those Eyes" is a song written by Terry Skinner and J. L. Wallace and recorded by American country music group The Forester Sisters. It was released in March 1986 as the fourth single from the album The Forester Sisters. The song was The Forester Sisters' third number one on the country chart. The single went to number one for one week and spent a total of fifteen weeks within the top 40.

== Chart performance ==
Chart (1986)	Peak position
US Hot Country Songs (Billboard)	1
Canadian RPM Country Tracks	1
