= Don't You (song) =

Single by The Forester Sisters

from the album Greatest Hits
- B-side: "All I Need"
- Released: June 24, 1989
- Genre: Country
- Length: 3:25
- Label: Warner Bros. Nashville
- Songwriters: Otha Young, Johnny Pierce
- Producer: Wendy Waldman

The Forester Sisters singles chronology
"Love Will" (1989)	"Don't You" (1989)	"Leave It Alone" (1989)

"Don't You" is a song written by Otha Young and Johnny Pierce and recorded by American country music group The Forester Sisters. It was released in June 1989 as the first single from their Greatest Hits compilation album. The song reached number 9 on the Billboard Hot Country Singles & Tracks chart.

== Chart performance ==
Chart (1989)	Peak position
Canada Country Singles (RPM)	15
US Hot Country Songs (Billboard)	9

=== Year-end charts ===
Chart (1989)	Position
US Country Songs (Billboard)	100
