= Bama (band) =

American studio pop group (1979)

- Origin: Muscle Shoals, Alabama, U.S.
- Genres: Pop
- Years active: 1979
- Labels: Free Flight, RCA
- Past members: Ken Bell; Terry Skinner; J.L. Wallace

Bama were an American studio pop group from Muscle Shoals, Alabama composed of Terry Skinner, Ken Bell, and J.L. Wallace. They released one album in 1979, Touch Me When We're Dancing, which included the single and title track "Touch Me When We're Dancing". The song charted number 86 US and number 42 US AC. The song was favorably reviewed in Billboard.

It was re-recorded and released by The Carpenters in 1981 with their version reaching number 16 US and number 1 US AC. Country music group Alabama also recorded a version in 1986 that reached number 1 on the country charts. Bama also wrote, but did not release their own version of the song "Even the Nights Are Better", which became a major hit for Air Supply in 1982. Lead Terry Skinner has been a successful songwriter writing some pop hits, but mostly country hits for acts such as The Forester Sisters, David Frizzell and Highway 101.

Terry Skinner (born August 24, 1943) died on November 14, 2014, at age 71.

Jerry Lee "J.L." Wallace died on July 22, 2018, at age 67.

== Studio album ==
- Touch Me When We're Dancing (Free Flight/RCA)
