= Early Tracks (album) =

Compilation album by Steve Earle
- Released: 1987
- Recorded: 1982–1985
- Genre: Country, Country rock
- Length: 36:02
- Label: Epic
- Producer: Pat Carter, Roy Dea

Steve Earle chronology
Early Tracks (1987)	Side Tracks (2002)

Professional ratings
Review scores
Source	Rating
Allmusic	2.5/5 stars

Early Tracks is a compilation album by Steve Earle. The album was released in 1987 capitalizing on the success of Guitar Town. The various rockabilly songs were recorded between 1982 and 1985; and includes songs from 1982's Pink and Black EP.

== Track listing ==
All songs written by Steve Earle unless otherwise noted.

1. "Nothin' but You" - 2:30 (Epic 34-04070a)
2. "If You Need a Fool" - 2:11
3. "Continental Trailways Blues" - 2:19 (Epic 34-04070b)
4. "Open Up Your Door" - 2:07
5. "Breakdown Land" (Dennis R. Colby) - 2:59
6. "Squeeze Me In" - 2:32 (Epic 34-04307a)
7. "Annie, Is Tonight the Night" - 2:32
8. "My Baby Worships Me" - 2:08 (Epic 34-04307b)
9. "Cadillac" (Cadillac Holmes) - 2:41
10. "Devil's Right Hand" - 2:58
11. "What'll You Do About Me" (Dennis Linde) - 2:37 (Epic 34-04666a)
12. "Cry Myself to Sleep" (Paul Kennerley) - 2:56 (Epic 34-04666b)
13. "A Little Bit in Love" - 2:19 (Epic 34-04784a)
14. "The Crush" (John Hiatt) - 3:18 (Epic 34-04784b)
- tracks 1, 3, 6, 8 are from Earle's Pink & Black 7-inch EP released by LSI Records in 1982; these were released on 7-inch singles by Epic Records in 1983.
- tracks 11, 12, 13, 14 are from 7-inch singles released by Epic Records in 1985; these were added to the Koch Records CD reissue.

== Personnel ==
- Steve Earle - guitar, vocals
- Pat Carter - guitar
- Ron Kling - bass
- Martin Parker - drums
- Dale Sellers - lead guitar on "Squeeze Me In"
