= Arthur Altman =

American songwriter (1910–1994)

- Born: 1910; Brooklyn, U.S.
- Died: January 18, 1994 (aged 83–84) Lake Worth, Florida, U.S.
- Occupation: Songwriter
- Instrument: Violin

Arthur Altman (1910 – January 18, 1994) was an American songwriter whose credits include "All or Nothing at All", with lyrics by Jack Lawrence, and the lyrics for "All Alone Am I", "I Will Follow Him", and "Truly, Truly True".

Altman studied violin and began his professional career as a violinist with the CBS Radio Orchestra. His first nationally known song was "Play Fiddle Play", which he wrote in the early 1930s for the orchestra leader Emory Deutsch.

Among the 400 songs he wrote, "All or Nothing at All" appears on more than 180 albums recorded by more than 150 artists including Count Basie, John Coltrane, Bing Crosby, Bobby Darin, Ella Fitzgerald, Jimmy Dorsey, Tommy Dorsey, Harry James, Oscar Peterson, Frank Sinatra, and Sarah Vaughan.

He died of a heart ailment.
