= Lyin' in His Arms Again =

Single by The Forester Sisters

from the album You Again
- B-side: "Wrap Me Up"
- Released: October 31, 1987
- Genre: Country
- Length: 3:31
- Label: Warner Bros. Nashville
- Songwriter(s): Terry Skinner, J. L. Wallace
- Producer(s): Terry Skinner, J. L. Wallace

The Forester Sisters singles chronology
"You Again" (1987)	"Lyin' in His Arms Again" (1987)	"Letter Home" (1988)

"Lyin' in His Arms Again" is a song written by Terry Skinner and J. L. Wallace, and recorded by American country music group The Forester Sisters. It was released in October 1987 as the third single from the album You Again. The song reached number 5 on the Billboard Hot Country Singles & Tracks chart.

== Charts ==
=== Weekly charts ===
Chart (1987–1988)	Peak position
US Hot Country Songs (Billboard)	5
Canadian RPM Country Tracks	5

=== Year-end charts ===
Chart (1988)	Position
US Hot Country Songs (Billboard)	98
