= Talkin' 'Bout Men =

Studio album by The Forester Sisters
- Released: March 26, 1991
- Studio: FAME Studios and Muscle Shoals Sound Studios (Muscle Shoals, Alabama); Music Box (Fort Payne, Alabama); Treasure Isle, Recording Arts and Creative Recording (Nashville, Tennessee).
- Genre: Country
- Length: 34:37
- Label: Warner Bros. Nashville
- Producer: Robert Byrne; Al Schulman

The Forester Sisters chronology
Come Hold Me (1990)	Talkin' 'Bout Men (1991)	I Got a Date (1992)

Professional ratings
Review scores
Source	Rating
AllMusic	3/5 stars

Talkin' 'Bout Men is the sixth studio album by American country music group The Forester Sisters. It was released in 1991 via Warner Bros. Records. The album peaked at number 16 on the Billboard Top Country Albums chart. Its title comes from the song "Men", which peaked at number 8 on the country singles charts.

== Critical reception ==
Johnny Loftus reviewed the album with favor on AllMusic, calling "Men" a "novelty hit" and "Bonnie Raitt-lite country pop number", also finding influences of Western swing and gospel in some tracks while simultaneously complimenting the sisters' harmonies.

== Track listing ==
No.	Title	Writer(s)	Length
1.	"A Step in the Right Direction"	Rick Bowles; Robert Byrne; Tom Wopat	2:34
2.	"Too Much Fun"	Byrne; Al Schulman	2:38
3.	"That Makes One of Us"	Bowles; Barbara Wyrick	3:18
4.	"Men"	Byrne; Schulman	3:20
5.	"Somebody Else's Moon"	Beth Nielsen Chapman; Kent Robbins	4:58
6.	"It's Gettin' Around"	Sandy Ramos; Bob Regan	3:19
7.	"You Take Me for Granted"	Leona Williams	3:23
8.	"The Blues Don't Stand a Chance"	Gary Burr; Jack Sundrud	3:42
9.	"Let Not Your Heart Be Troubled"	Tim Nichols; Jimmy Alan Stewart	2:52
10.	"What About Tonight"	John Jarrard; J. D. Martin	4:33
Total length:			34:37

== Personnel ==
Adapted from Talkin' 'Bout Men liner notes.

The Forester Sisters

- Christy Forester – vocals
- June Forester – vocals
- Kathy Forester – vocals
- Kim Forester – vocals

Musicians

- Clayton Ivey – keyboards
- Steve Nathan – keyboards
- Hargus "Pig" Robbins – keyboards
- Robert Byrne – electric guitar, acoustic guitar
- Bill Hinds – electric guitar
- Billy Joe Walker Jr. – acoustic guitar
- John Willis – electric guitar
- Bruce Bouton – steel guitar, dobro
- Larry Paxton – bass guitar
- Michael Rhodes - bass guitar
- Bob Wray – bass guitar
- Owen Hale – drums
- Rob Hajacos – fiddle
- Guy Higginbotham – saxophone

Technical

- Richard Helm – A&R direction
- Robert Byrne – producer, mixing, mastering
- Alan Schulman – producer, engineer, mixing, mastering
- Rok Campbell – assistant engineer
- Jonathan Grimm – assistant engineer
- Pat Hutchinson – assistant engineer
- Daniel Johnston – assistant engineer
- Vicki Lancaster – assistant engineer
- Steve Lowery – assistant engineer
- Ed Turner – assistant engineer
- Hollis Flatt – mastering
- M.C. Rather – mastering
- Custom Mastering (Nashville, Tennessee) – mastering location
- Laura LiPuma – art direction, design
- Mark Tucker – photography
- Judy Seale and Refugee Management, Inc. – management

== Charts ==
=== Weekly charts ===
Chart (1991)	Peak position
US Billboard 200	137
US Top Country Albums (Billboard)	16

=== Year-end charts ===
Chart (1991)	Position
US Top Country Albums (Billboard)	75
