= Too Many Rivers =

- Danish release picture sleeve

Single by Brenda Lee

from the album Too Many Rivers
- B-side: "No One"
- Released: 1965
- Recorded: 1964
- Genre: Pop, easy listening
- Length: 2:48
- Label: Decca
- Songwriter(s): Harlan Howard

Brenda Lee singles chronology
"Truly, Truly True" (1965)	"Too Many Rivers" (1965)	"No One" (1965)

"Too Many Rivers"

Single by The Forester Sisters

from the album You Again
- B-side: "If I'm Gonna Fall (I'm Gonna Fall in Love)"
- Released: March 7, 1987
- Genre: Country
- Length: 3:16
- Label: Warner Bros. Nashville
- Songwriter(s): Harlan Howard
- Producer(s): Terry Skinner, J.L. Wallace

The Forester Sisters singles chronology
"Too Much Is Not Enough" (1986)	"Too Many Rivers" (1987)	"You Again" (1987)

"Too Many Rivers" is a Harlan Howard composition which was a 1965 hit single for Brenda Lee.

== Brenda Lee version ==
Brenda Lee recorded "Too Many Rivers" in a January 29, 1964 recording session at Columbia Recording Studio, Nashville, TN overseen by producer Owen Bradley. The song was not released until May 1965 and then as the B-side of the single "No One". However, airplay favored "Too Many Rivers", which entered the Hot 100 in Billboard dated May 29, 1965 at #96, besting the #98 debut of "No One", which then dropped off the chart. "Too Many Rivers" continued to climb up the charts, and eventually ascended to a #13 peak on the Hot 100 dated July 13, 1965. "Too Many Rivers" also reached #22 on the UK chart, affording Lee her final UK hit.

== Other versions ==
The first evident release of "Too Many Rivers" had been a single release for C&W singer Claude Gray whose version had also been recorded at Columbia Recording Studio Nashville, its session occurring on September 17, 1964. Subsequent to the Pop chart success of the Brenda Lee version, "Too Many Rivers" was recorded for albums (title in parentheses) by a large number of C&W artists: Eddy Arnold (My World/ 1965), Margie Singleton (Crying Time/ 1965), Kitty Wells (Country All the Way/ 1966), Liz Anderson (...Sings/ 1967), Connie Smith (Back in Baby's Arms/ 1969), Jessi Colter (A Country Star is Born/ 1970), Ray Price (You Wouldn't Know Love/ 1970), The Statler Brothers (...Sing Country Symphonies In E Major/ 1972), Johnny Rodriguez (Just Get Up & Close the Door/ 1975) Sonny James (Sunny side Up/ 1979), Jean Shepard (Dear John/ 1981). Also "Too Many Rivers" was recorded by Anita Carter in a 19 July 1968 recording session at RCA Victor Studio in Nashville TN produced by Bob Montgomery, with the track being issued as the B-side of the single "To Be a Child Again". However "Too Many Rivers" did not become a C&W hit until 1987 when the Forester Sisters' version from their You Again album was issued as an advance single to reach #5 on the Billboard C&W chart.

Veteran UK vocalist Vera Lynn remade "Too Many Rivers" for her 1977 album release ...Sings which album - featuring the Geoff Love Orchestra and the Jordanaires chorale - was produced by Owen Bradley the producer of Brenda Lee's "Too Many Rivers" single: credited to Vera Lynn With The Jordanaires, "Too Many Rivers" had a September 30, 1977 UK single release. "Too Many Rivers" has also been recorded by Joe Simon (Simon Pure Soul/ 1966), Jerry Lee Lewis (Who's Gonna Play This Old Piano?/ 1972), Marie Osmond (Paper Roses/ 1973), Webb Wilder & the Nashvegans (Town & Country/ 1995), and Annette Klingenberg (da) (Weep No More/ 1998). The Finnish rendering "Niin Monta Virtaa" was recorded by Katri Helena for her 1975 album Paloma Blanca.

== Charts (Brenda Lee Version) ==
=== Weekly charts ===
Chart (1965)	Peak position
Australia	99
UK Singles Chart	22
US Adult Contemporary (Billboard)	2
US Billboard Hot 100	13
US Cash Box Top 100	15

=== Year-end charts ===
Chart (1965)	Position
US Billboard Hot 100	79

== Charts (The Forrester Sisters Version) ==
=== The Forester Sisters ===
Chart (1987)	Peak position
US Hot Country Songs (Billboard)	5
Canadian RPM Country Tracks	4
