= Come Hold Me =

Studio album by The Forester Sisters
- Released: 1990
- Genre: Country
- Label: Warner Nashville
- Producer: Wendy Waldman

The Forester Sisters chronology
Greatest Hits (1989)	Come Hold Me (1990)	Talkin' 'Bout Men (1991)

Come Hold Me is the fifth studio album by the American country music group The Forester Sisters. It was released in 1990 by Warner Records Nashville.

== Content ==
"Drive South" and "Nothing's Gonna Bother Me Tonight" were both issued as singles from the album, both peaking at number 63 on Hot Country Songs in 1990.

== Critical reception ==
Jerry Sharpe of The Pittsburgh Press gave the album a mixed review, saying that it had "too much rock coupled with so-so material". He praised the singles, along with the title track and "You'll Be Mine", as the strongest for their vocal performances.

== Track listing ==
1. "Nothing's Gonna Bother Me Tonight" (Bernie Nelson, Allen Shamblin) - 3:05
2. "I Struck Gold" (Karen Staley, Gary Harrison) - 3:09
3. "Old Enough to Know" (Wendy Waldman, Franne Golde) - 3:47
4. "Between My Heart and Me" (Don Schlitz, Brent Maher) - 3:22
5. "Drive South" (John Hiatt) - 4:05
  - featuring The Bellamy Brothers
6. "Come Hold Me" (Johnny Neel, Joe Diffie) - 4:38
7. "You'll Be Mine" (Tom Campbell, Casey Kelly) - 3:34
8. "Born to Give My Love to You" (Mary Ann Kennedy, Pam Rose, Pat Bunch) - 3:15
9. "You Can't Have a Good Time Without Me" (Lisa Silver, Lewis Anderson, Russell Smith) - 3:22
10. "Better Be Some Tears" (Bill LaBounty, Beckie Foster, Kerry Chater) - 4:11

== Personnel ==
Adapted from Come Hold Me liner notes.

The Forester Sisters

- Christy Forester – lead vocals (4), harmony vocals (all other tracks)
- June Forester – lead vocals (9), harmony vocals (all other tracks)
- Kim Forester – lead vocals (1, 5, 6, 8), harmony vocals (all other tracks)
- Kathy Forester – lead vocals (2, 3, 7, 10), harmony vocals (all other tracks)

Additional vocals

- The Bellamy Brothers:
  - David Bellamy – additional lead vocals on "Drive South"
  - Howard Bellamy – harmony vocals on "Drive South"

Musicians

- Gary Prim – keyboards
- Matt Rollings – acoustic piano
- Craig Bickhardt – acoustic guitars
- Brent Rowan – electric guitars
- Sam Bush – mandolin
- Paul Franklin – steel guitar
- Willie Weeks – bass guitar
- Harry Stinson – drums
- Mark O'Connor – fiddle

Technical

- Wendy Waldman – producer
- Dennis Ritchie – recording, mixing
- Denny Purcell – mastering at Georgetown Masters (Nashville, Tennessee)

== Chart performance ==
Chart (1990)	Peak position
US Top Country Albums (Billboard)	54
