= Is It True (Brenda Lee song) =

Single by Brenda Lee

from the album Brenda Lee Sings Top Teen Hits
- B-side: "What'd I Say" (UK)/"Just Behind the Rainbow" (US)
- Released: 1964
- Recorded: 1964
- Genre: Rock; beat
- Length: 2:20
- Label: Decca
- Songwriter: Carter & Lewis
- Producer: Mickie Most

Brenda Lee singles chronology
"He's Sure to Remember Me" (1964)	"Is It True" (1964)	"Thanks a Lot" (1965)

"Is It True" is a song released in 1964 by Brenda Lee. In 1964, Brenda Lee was flown by Decca to England to cut a single record, initially conceived for release exclusively in the United Kingdom, but it was in fact also released in the US shortly after release in the UK. "Is It True" was written by John Carter and Ken Lewis, then two of England's top songwriters.

The single reached No. 17 on both the United Kingdom's Record Retailer chart and the United States' Billboard Hot 100 chart, and reached No. 8 on Canada's RPM "Top 40 & 5" and No. 11 on Canada's CHUM Hit Parade.

The guitarist on the single was Jimmy Page who achieved an early wah pedal effect (0:38–0:42) before the effect became popular. The drummer on the session was Bobby Graham, the production was by Mickie Most and it was recorded at Decca's #2 recording studio in West Hampstead, London.
