= Lonely Alone =

Single by The Forester Sisters

from the album Perfume, Ribbons & Pearls
- B-side: "Heartless Night"
- Released: July 5, 1986
- Genre: Country
- Length: 3:31
- Label: Warner Bros. Nashville
- Songwriter(s): J. D. Martin, John Jarrard
- Producer(s): Terry Skinner, J. L. Wallace

The Forester Sisters singles chronology
"Mama's Never Seen Those Eyes" (1986)	"Lonely Alone" (1986)	"Too Much Is Not Enough" (1986)

"Lonely Alone" is a song written by J. D. Martin and John Jarrard, and recorded by American country music group The Forester Sisters. It was released in July 1986 as the first and only single from the album Perfume, Ribbons & Pearls. The song reached #2 on the Billboard Hot Country Singles & Tracks chart.

== Chart performance ==
Chart (1986)	Peak position
US Hot Country Songs (Billboard)	2
Canadian RPM Country Tracks	3
