= You Again (album) =

Studio album by The Forester Sisters
- Released: 1987
- Genre: Country
- Label: Warner Nashville
- Producer: Barry Beckett (tracks 2, 6, 9); Emory Gordy Jr. (tracks 1, 5, 7, 10); Terry Skinner (tracks 3, 4, 8); James Stroud (tracks 2, 6, 9); J. L. Wallace (tracks 3, 4, 8)

The Forester Sisters chronology
Perfume, Ribbons & Pearls (1986)	You Again (1987)	Sincerely (1988)

Singles from You Again
- 1. "Too Many Rivers" Released: March 7, 1987; 2. "You Again" Released: June 27, 1987; 3. "Lyin' in His Arms Again" Released: October 31, 1987

You Again is the third studio album by the American country music group The Forester Sisters. It was released in 1987 via Warner Records Nashville.

== Content ==
Three singles charted from the album: a cover of Brenda Lee's 1965 single "Too Many Rivers", followed by the title track and "Lyin' in His Arms Again". Of these, "You Again" achieved the number one position on Hot Country Songs in 1987, while the other two both peaked at number five on the same.

"Sooner or Later" was later covered by Eddy Raven, who released it in 1990 as a single from his album Temporary Sanity. As with the Forester Sisters' version, Raven's was also produced by Barry Beckett.

== Track listing ==
No.	Title	Writer(s)	Length
1.	"That's What Your Love Does to Me"	Bill Caswell; Chick Rains	2:35
2.	"You Again"	Don Schlitz; Paul Overstreet	3:19
3.	"Before You"	Chris Waters; Terri Gibbs	2:26
4.	"Too Many Rivers"	Harlan Howard	3:15
5.	"My Mother's Eyes"	Gary Harrison; Karen Staley	3:19
6.	"Sooner or Later"	Bill LaBounty; Beckie Foster; Susan Longacre	4:23
7.	"I Can't Lose What I Never Had"	Jim Rushing	2:34
8.	"Lyin' in His Arms Again"	J. L. Wallace; Terry Skinner	3:30
9.	"Down the Road"	J. R. Roper; Joy Henley; Kent Blazy	3:00
10.	"Wrap Me Up"	Holly Dunn; Radney Foster	2:23

== Personnel ==
=== The Forester Sisters ===
- Christy Forester – vocals
- June Forester – vocals
- Kathy Forester – vocals
- Kim Forester – vocals

=== Musicians ===
- John Barlow Jarvis – keyboards (1, 5, 7, 10)
- Barry Beckett – keyboards (2, 6, 9)
- Mitch Humphries – keyboards (2, 6, 9)
- Carl Marsh – Fairlight Series III computer programming (2, 6, 9)
- Steve Nathan – keyboards (3, 4, 8), synthesizers (3, 4, 8)
- Larry Byrom – acoustic guitar (1, 5, 7, 10), electric guitar (1, 5, 7, 10)
- Reggie Young – electric guitar (1, 5, 7, 10)
- Mark Casstevens – acoustic guitars (2, 6, 9), mandolin (2, 6, 9)
- Brent Rowan – lead guitar (2, 6, 9), rhythm guitar (2, 6, 9)
- Will McFarlane – acoustic guitar (3, 4, 8)
- J.L. Wallace – electric guitars (3, 4, 8)
- John Willis – acoustic guitar (3, 4, 8)
- Paul Franklin – pedal steel guitar (1, 5, 7, 10)
- Sonny Garrish – steel guitar (2, 6, 9), pedal steel guitar (3, 4, 8)
- Emory Gordy Jr. – bass guitar (1, 5, 7, 10)
- Bob Wray – bass guitar (2, 6, 9)
- Terry "Bus" Adkins – bass guitar (3, 4, 8)
- Lonnie "Butch" Ledford – bass guitar (3, 4, 8)
- Larrie Londin – drums (1, 5, 7, 10)
- Owen Hale – drums (2, 3, 4, 6, 8, 9)
- Buddy Spicher – fiddle (2, 6, 9)
- Hoot Hester – fiddle (3, 4, 8)

==== Production ====
- Emory Gordy Jr. – producer (1, 5, 8, 10)
- Barry Beckett – producer (2, 6, 9)
- James Stroud – producer (2, 6, 9)
- Terry Skinner – producer (3, 4, 8), assistant engineer (3, 4, 8), remix assistant
- J.L. Wallace – producer (3, 4, 8)
- George Clinton – engineer (1, 5, 8, 10)
- Jim Cotton – engineer (1, 5, 8, 10)
- Paul Goldberg – engineer (1, 5, 8, 10)
- Joe Scaife – engineer (1, 5, 8, 10)
- Bill Deaton – engineer (2, 6, 9)
- Steve Melton – engineer (3, 4, 8), remixing
- Tim Farmer – assistant engineer (2, 6, 9)
- Greg Pirls – assistant engineer (2, 6, 9)
- Randy Best – assistant engineer (3, 4, 8)
- Vicki Lancaster – assistant engineer (3, 4, 8), remix assistant
- Steve Moore – assistant engineer (3, 4, 8)
- Scott Hendricks – remixing
- Chris Hammond – remix assistant
- Denny Purcell – mastering
- Carlos Grier – mastering assistant
- Virginia Team – album design
- Andy Engel – lettering design
- Empire Studio – photography
- Joan Robbins – wardrobe stylist
- June Arnold – make-up
- Marilyn Thomason – hair stylist
- Gerald Roy and Stellar Entertainment – management

Studios

- Recorded at Muscle Shoals Sound Studios (Sheffield, Alabama); East Avalon Recorders (Muscle Shoals, Alabama); The Music Mill, Woodland Studios, Center Stage Studio and Champagne Studios (Nashville, Tennessee).
- Remixed at The Castle (Franklin, Tennessee) and Muscle Shoals Sound Studios.
- Mastered at Georgetown Masters (Nashville, Tennessee).

== Chart performance ==
Chart (1987)	Peak position
US Top Country Albums (Billboard)	13
