= (That's What You Do) When You're in Love =

Single by The Forester Sisters

from the album The Forester Sisters
- B-side: "Yankee Don't Go Home"
- Released: January 26, 1985
- Genre: Country
- Length: 3:06
- Label: Warner Bros. Nashville
- Songwriters: Ken Bell, Terry Skinner, J. L. Wallace
- Producers: Terry Skinner, J. L. Wallace

The Forester Sisters singles chronology
"(That's What You Do) When You're in Love" (1985)	"I Fell in Love Again Last Night" (1985)

"(That's What You Do) When You're in Love" is a debut song written by Ken Bell, Terry Skinner and J. L. Wallace, and recorded by American country music group The Forester Sisters. It was released in January 1985 as the first single from the album The Forester Sisters. The song reached #10 on the Billboard Hot Country Singles & Tracks chart.

== Chart performance ==
Chart (1985)	Peak position
US Hot Country Songs (Billboard)	10
