= What'll You Do About Me =

1984 song by McGuffey Lane, also recorded by Doug Supernaw in 1995

Single by Doug Supernaw

from the album Deep Thoughts from a Shallow Mind
- B-side: "Wishin' Her Well"
- Released: January 9, 1995
- Genre: Country
- Length: 2:41
- Label: BNA
- Songwriter: Dennis Linde
- Producer: Richard Landis

Doug Supernaw singles chronology
"You Never Even Called Me by My Name" (1994)	"What'll You Do About Me" (1995)	"Not Enough Hours in the Night" (1995)

"What'll You Do About Me" is a country music song written by Dennis Linde. It was originally recorded in 1984 by McGuffey Lane and then by Steve Earle. It has also been recorded by Randy Travis on his 1987 album, Always & Forever, The Forester Sisters in 1992, and Doug Supernaw, the last of whom took it to the Top 20 on the Billboard country charts in early 1995. Supernaw's version appears on his album Deep Thoughts from a Shallow Mind. Supernaw's version was met with mixed reception, and denied airplay by certain radio stations across the United States, due to concerns over its lyrical content of stalking.

== Content ==
"What'll You Do About Me" describes a stalker who is singing to his object of affection. Specifically, what initially began as a one-night stand between the narrator and the woman in question ultimately results in the narrator developing an obsessive behavior towards her that he shamelessly declares unstoppable regardless of any attempt on the woman's part to isolate herself from the narrator or to prevent his behavior from escalating.

== Recording history ==
McGuffey Lane was the first artist or group to record the song in 1984 on their album Day by Day for Atlantic Records. Steve Earle was the second artist to record the song, doing so also in 1984, on Epic Records. Released as a single that year, Earle's rendition peaked at number 76 on the country charts. However, this version was not included on an album until 2005, when Koch Records included it on a reissue of the compilation album Early Tracks. Other subsequent recordings of the song include John Schneider on his album Too Good to Stop Now (1984), Randy Travis on his album Always & Forever (1987), The Forester Sisters on their album I Got a Date (1992), Nitty Gritty Dirt Band on their album Not Fade Away (1992), and Doug Supernaw on his album Deep Thoughts from a Shallow Mind (1995). The Forester Sisters and Supernaw both released their versions as singles also. Supernaw's rendition was the highest-peaking of the three, peaking at number 16 on the U.S. country charts.

== Critical reception ==
In his book Steve Earle: Fearless Heart, Outlaw Poet, author David McGee describes Earle's rendition as having "a hard country edge and snarling, borderline confrontational vocal." He compared it to Travis's recording, saying that his interpretation showed a "cool, maybe even slightly goofy would-be paramour[…]treating it as a humorous depiction of all-consuming love—no harm, no foul." In Richard Carlin's book Country Music: A Biographical Dictionary, the author says that since Supernaw's version was released while the O. J. Simpson trials were underway, the trials "offered a somewhat creepy parallel to the song, which seemed to be sympathetic toward the abusive man."

Due to concerns that the lyrics were overly favorable to the concept of a stalker in the wake of the O. J. Simpson trials, BNA Records sent out an alternate version which replaced the line "I'm on the porch with a two-by-two" to "I'm on the porch with a dinner for two." This altered version still met negative reception from radio programmers, and fell swiftly from the number 16 position on the Billboard Hot Country Songs charts. WTHI-FM in Terre Haute, Indiana also withdrew the song from rotation after a woman in that city was murdered by a stalker. Supernaw had wanted to ask his label to release another single from the project, but the label instead chose to drop him due to the ensuing controversy.

== Chart history ==
=== Steve Earle ===
Chart (1984)	Peak position
U.S. Billboard Hot Country Singles	76

=== The Forester Sisters ===
Chart (1992)	Peak position
US Hot Country Songs (Billboard)	74

=== Doug Supernaw ===
"What'll You Do About Me" debuted at number 62 on the U.S. Billboard Hot Country Singles & Tracks for the week of January 14, 1995.

Chart (1995)	Peak position
Canada Country Singles (RPM)	26
US Hot Country Songs (Billboard)	16
