= You Again (song) =

Single by The Forester Sisters

from the album You Again
- B-side: "Whatever You Do, Don't"
- Released: June 27, 1987
- Genre: Country
- Length: 3:19
- Label: Warner Bros. Nashville
- Songwriter(s): Paul Overstreet; Don Schlitz
- Producer(s): James Stroud; Barry Beckett

The Forester Sisters singles chronology
"Too Many Rivers" (1987)	"You Again" (1987)	"Lyin' in His Arms Again" (1987)

"You Again", sometimes referred to as "(I'd Choose) You Again", is a song written by Paul Overstreet and Don Schlitz, and recorded by American country music group The Forester Sisters. It was released in June 1987 as the second single and title track from the album You Again. The single went to number one for one week and spent a total of fourteen weeks within the top 40, and was their fourth and final number one single.

== Charts ==
=== Weekly charts ===
Chart (1987)	Peak position
US Hot Country Songs (Billboard)	1
Canadian RPM Country Tracks	3

=== Year-end charts ===
Chart (1987)	Position
US Hot Country Songs (Billboard)	7
