= The Forester Sisters =

American country music vocal group

- Promotional image of The Forester Sisters, 1987 (L-R: Kathy, Christy, June, and Kim)

Background information
- Origin: Lookout Mountain, Georgia, U.S.
- Genres: Country
- Years active: 1982–1996
- Label: Warner Nashville
- Past members: Christy Forester; June Forester; Kathy Forester; Kim Forester

The Forester Sisters were an American country music vocal group consisting of sisters Kathy, June, Kim, and Christy Forester. Having performed together locally in their native Lookout Mountain, Georgia, since the 1970s, the four sisters began singing full-time in the 1980s and signed to Warner Records Nashville in 1984. Their greatest commercial success came between then and 1991, when they charted fifteen top-ten hits on the Billboard Hot Country Songs chart, five of which went to number one: "I Fell in Love Again Last Night", "Just in Case", "Mama's Never Seen Those Eyes", "Too Much Is Not Enough" (with The Bellamy Brothers), and "You Again". They won the Academy of Country Music Group of the Year award in 1986 and were nominated three times for a Grammy Award. In addition to their country music albums, they released multiple albums of gospel music and one of Christmas music.

The group's sound is defined primarily by four-part vocal harmonies, most often with Kim or Kathy singing lead vocals. Their style has been compared to other contemporary family-based country music groups such as the Judds and the Whites, while critical reception to their body of work has generally been mixed. The sisters retired from the music industry in 1996 and found work in other fields.

== Early life ==
The Forester Sisters are four sisters who were born and raised in Lookout Mountain, Georgia: Kathy (born January 4, 1955), June (born September 22, 1956), Kim (born November 4, 1960), and Christy (born December 21, 1962). The sisters' parents, Vonnie Geneva (née Gray; 1932–2018) and Clyde D. "Bunk" Forester, would encourage the four to rehearse music for church choir every week, something which Christy later observed would help the sisters learn how to sing in harmony.

In addition to their church work, Kathy and June performed in local bands during the late 1970s while also holding jobs as schoolteachers. After Christy had finished college, the four sisters decided to begin performing professionally. Songwriters Bobby Keel and Billy Stone discovered them at a local music festival, and invited them to record a demo at a music studio in Muscle Shoals, Alabama. The demo tape was sent to Paige Rowden, the artists and repertoire representative for Warner Bros. Records' Nashville division, who arranged for them to audition at the label after hearing them open for Larry Gatlin & the Gatlin Brothers. Jim Ed Norman, a record producer who was then also the president of Warner Bros. Nashville, signed the sisters in late 1984. According to Kim, when the sisters were first contacted by the label, she thought that the call was a prank and immediately hung up before the label called a second time.

== Career ==
The group's debut single "(That's What You Do) When You're in Love", released in mid-1985, reached a peak of number ten on the Billboard Hot Country Songs charts. The song served as the lead single for their self-titled debut album released later that year. Three more singles from the album would reach number one on the same chart by 1986; in order of release, these were "I Fell in Love Again Last Night", "Just in Case", and "Mama's Never Seen Those Eyes". Muscle Shoals-based songwriters Terry Skinner and J. L. Wallace produced the album and co-wrote both "When You're in Love" and "Mama's Never Seen Those Eyes"; they wrote the former with Ken Bell, with whom they had previously recorded in the band Bama. "Just in Case" was written by Exile members J. P. Pennington and Sonny LeMaire, and previously recorded by that band on their 1984 album Kentucky Hearts. Sales figures from Warner Bros. Nashville indicated that more than 100,000 copies of "I Fell in Love Again Last Night" were sold. Coinciding with the success of this album, the sisters were nominated by the Academy of Country Music for Vocal Group of the Year in both 1985 and 1986, winning the award in the latter year. The album itself was nominated for Best Country Performance by a Duo or Group with Vocal at the 28th Annual Grammy Awards in 1985. Also stemming from the album's commercial success was an extensive touring schedule, consisting of performances with Alabama, George Jones, Ricky Skaggs, and several other country music artists throughout 35 states. An uncredited review in People was mixed, calling their sound "heavy on country" and stating that the gospel sound of "The Missing Part" "adds a distinct warmth that blends cosily with the quartet's brightness". At the time of the album's release, Kathy lived with her husband Terry Adkins, who was also their manager and bass guitarist, while the other three sisters continued to live with their parents.

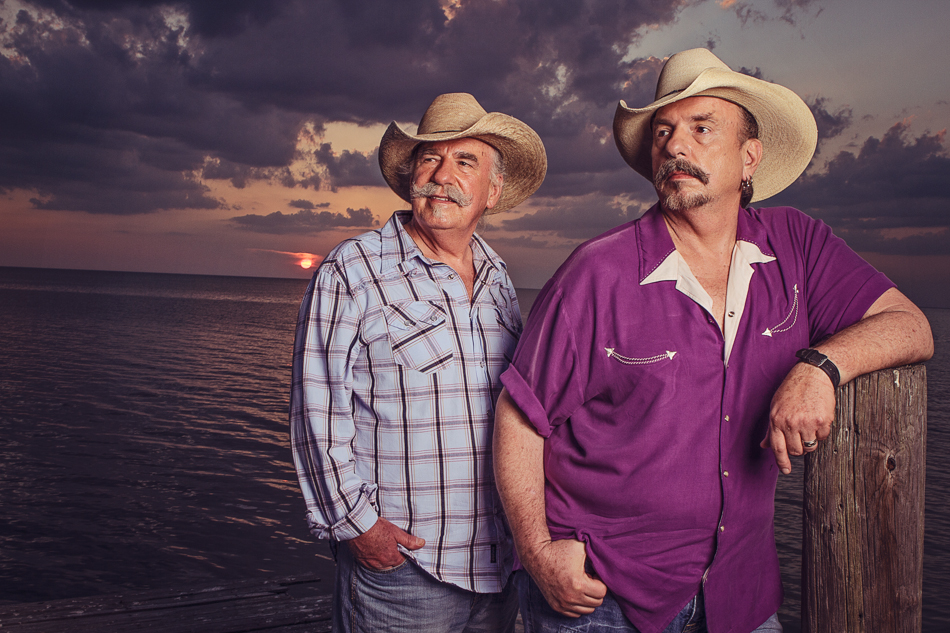
The Forester Sisters recorded two collaborations with The Bellamy Brothers (pictured here in 2013): "Too Much Is Not Enough" in 1986, and "Drive South" four years later.

The quartet's second album was 1986's Perfume, Ribbons & Pearls. It charted only one single in "Lonely Alone", which spent two weeks at the number two position on Hot Country Songs that year. Contributing songwriters to the album included Pam Tillis, Bob McDill, and Walt Aldridge. As with the previous album, Skinner and Wallace stayed on as producers. People published a positive review, praising the vocal deliveries of all four sisters while also stating that the album "warms the heart while it invigorates the toe". Cliff Radel of The Cincinnati Enquirer rated the album 2 out of 5 stars, calling the singing "clear as the sky on a crisp fall day" but criticizing the "poverty stricken songs". Montreal Gazette writer Lucinda Chodan contrasted the quartet's sound with that of The Judds, stating that "those celestial voices are harmonizing in the service of songs that, for the most part, are about as individual as pennies in a jar." She thought that "100% Chance of Blue" and the cover of The Supremes' "Back in My Arms Again" were the most distinct songs, but still criticized the production. After "Lonely Alone", the Forester Sisters were featured vocalists on The Bellamy Brothers' late-1986 hit "Too Much Is Not Enough", a number-one single from their album Country Rap. Following this song's success, the two acts toured together the following year on the Brothers and Sisters Tour.

=== Late 1980s ===
You Again, the sisters' third album, accounted for three singles upon its 1987 release. First was a cover of Brenda Lee's 1965 hit "Too Many Rivers", which the Forester Sisters took to top five on the country charts. After it came the title track, which became the sisters' fifth and final number-one hit. The last single was the top-five "Lyin' in His Arms Again", also written by Skinner and Wallace. The two split the album's production duties with Barry Beckett, James Stroud, and Emory Gordy Jr. Also included on the album was "Sooner or Later", later a top-ten hit in 1990 for Eddy Raven. James M. Tarbox of Knight Ridder News Service reviewed the album favorably, considering the album "consistent" for its lyrical themes of love while also noting that the sound was both "traditional" and "savvy for a couple of tunes to easily cross over to other formats." Alongside You Again, the sisters also recorded A Christmas Card, an album composed of traditional Christmas carols which was issued later in 1987.

The next album was 1988's Sincerely. Its lead single was "Letter Home", followed by a cover of the 1950s pop standard "Sincerely", and finally "Love Will". Included on the album were a cover of The Beatles' "I've Just Seen a Face", and the Harlan Howard composition "These Lips Don't Know How to Say Goodbye", later a top-ten country hit for Doug Stone in 1991. Songwriter Wendy Waldman, who wrote "Love Will", handled most of the production duties on this album, with assistance on some tracks from Beckett, Stroud, and Norman. Sincerely accounted for the quartet's second Grammy Award for Best Country Performance by a Duo or Group with Vocal nomination at the 31st Annual Grammy Awards in 1988. Jan Walker of The Orlando Sentinel said that "there's a confident sound to each of the 10 songs on the album, a showcase for the seemingly effortless natural harmony of four sibling voices." William Ruhlmann of AllMusic reviewed the album with favor as well, stating that "[a]lready the possessors of a wonderful vocal harmony style, The Foresters hit a peak when they hooked up with writer/producer Wendy Waldman for this album, cutting her 'Letter Home' and other strong material".

Warner Bros. released two more projects featuring the sisters in 1989. First was a gospel album entitled All I Need. This included renditions of traditional hymns and spirituals such as "Amazing Grace" and "Precious Memories", along with popular 20th-century gospel songs such as "This Ole House". Christy described the album as "roots that we returned to", a reference to the sisters' upbringing as singers in their churches. Norman, Beckett, and Stroud co-produced the album. Later in 1989 came a Greatest Hits package. Included on it were two new songs: "Don't You" and "Leave It Alone", both of which reached top ten on Hot Country Songs that year. By decade's end, the group's first fourteen singles had all achieved top-ten positions on that chart, at the time the longest such streak achieved by a new artist since the Billboard country charts were expanded to 100 positions in the 1960s.

=== 1990s ===
Despite the momentum of their previous singles, the group's 1990 album Come Hold Me was unsuccessful on the country charts, with neither of its two selected singles reaching Top 40. These were a cover of John Hiatt's "Drive South" which also featured guest vocals from the Bellamy Brothers, and "Nothing's Gonna Bother Me Tonight". Waldman produced the album by herself this time. Contributing musicians included Sam Bush, Mark O'Connor, Willie Weeks, and Craig Bickhardt. Jerry Sharpe of The Pittsburgh Press gave the album a mixed review, saying that it had "too much rock coupled with so-so material". He praised the singles, along with the title track and "You'll Be Mine" as the strongest for their vocal performances.

In April 1991, Warner released the group's next album Talkin' 'Bout Men. Robert Byrne, another Muscle Shoals-based musician, produced the album and played guitar on it. It was recorded in the same studio where the group had made their demos and first two studio albums. The sisters noted that previous producers had wanted to highlight their "softer" sound, whereas Byrne was willing to include country rock and Western swing. Lead single "Men", co-written by Byrne, went on to chart at number eight on Hot Country Songs that year. Kim said of "Men", a novelty song about the relationships between men and women as seen from a woman's perspective, that she found it relatable because she had listened to it after having an argument with her husband. The song's success also led to a parody called "Women", recorded on Curb Records by a studio band called the Bandit Brothers; by mid-1991, this parody had charted on Hot Country Songs as well. "Men" became the sisters' third nomination for Grammy Award for Best Country Performance by a Duo or Group with Vocal, receiving the nomination at the 34th Annual Grammy Awards in 1991. Despite the success of "Men", the album charted only one other single in "Too Much Fun", which reached number 62. Johnny Loftus reviewed the album with favor on AllMusic, calling "Men" a "Bonnie Raitt-lite country pop number", and finding influences of Western swing and gospel in some tracks while simultaneously complimenting the sisters' harmonies.

The sisters' final chart entries came in 1992 from the album I Got a Date. Both "What'll You Do About Me" (later a top-20 hit in 1995 for Doug Supernaw) and the title track fell short of the country music top 40. June told The News-Press at the time of the album's release that the sisters wanted to show their "witty, mischievous side". The group also saw it as a concept album thematically similar in concept to "Men". Kim highlighted the title track in particular, stating that she was going through a divorce at the time of recording and felt that at the age of 31, she was "too old to start dating again". Tom Roland of AllMusic wrote that the album was "wide-ranging stylistically, with a strong dose of wit, particularly in the title track and 'Redneck Romeo.'"

The sisters took a hiatus from recording for much of the mid-1990s, but continued to tour regionally, though primarily on weekends in order to tend to their children the rest of the week. They returned to the studio for a new album called More Than I Am in 1996. Warner marketed the album as "positive country", featuring positive and spiritual messages without being explicitly contemporary Christian music in nature, and taking inspiration from similar releases by Ricky Van Shelton and Susie Luchsinger. Christy's husband, Gary Smith, produced the album and played keyboards on it. Among the contributing songwriters were Karen Staley and Paul Overstreet, the latter of whom had previously co-written the group's "I Fell in Love Again Last Night". After this album, the sisters decided to retire from the music business, citing both a desire to spend more time with their families and the genre's increasing focus on male artists. Kathy subsequently became a music teacher, June a teacher for students with visual impairments, and both Kim and Christy, interior designers. The four sisters reunited for one concert in 2013 to honor their induction into the Georgia Music Hall of Fame.

== Musical styles ==
The group's sound is defined mainly by four-part vocal harmonies, typically with Kim or Kathy handling the lead vocal parts. However, both Perfume, Ribbons & Pearls and Come Hold Me featured songs where Christy or June sang lead instead. Of the vocal arrangements, Christy told The Tennessean in 1985 that "it's just pretty much what we hear in our heads". Due to their early experiences singing in church, the sisters would often sing a cappella gospel standards in concert. The sisters have cited Bonnie Raitt, Emmylou Harris, and Linda Ronstadt as their primary musical influences. Thomas Goldsmith of The Tennessean wrote that Kim's "alto voice is key to the group's densely textured sound". He also noted between their first two singles the "unusual subject matter" of "When You're in Love", about a woman who "threatens reprisal" for an unfaithful husband, as well as the "carousel keyboards and ringing guitars" of "I Fell in Love Again Last Night". A review of Perfume, Ribbons & Pearls published in People compared Kathy and Kim's voices favorably to Terri Gibbs. James M. Tarbox of Knight Ridder News Services described the sisters' voices as having "a coquetteish playfulness they keep under enough control that it neither becomes cloying nor prevents them from offering something as thoughtful as the hit 'Too Many Rivers'".

The Forester Sisters were frequently compared to other family music groups of the time, including the Judds and the Whites. An uncredited review from People called the sisters "the cheeriest bunch of good old gals... since the Mandrells" (Barbara Mandrell, Louise Mandrell, and Irlene Mandrell), and noted that unlike The Whites, the Forester Sisters did not have a male vocalist to "[give] more depth and richness to the family harmonies". The sisters' concerts were reportedly more heavily attended by women than men, an observation made by both Billboard and The Tennessean. Similarly, a review of Perfume, Ribbons & Pearls in People stated that "Along with the Judds, the Foresters have helped fill the female group gap in country music". Colin Larkin wrote in the Virgin Encyclopedia of Country Music that "their glossy, professional sound and looks appealed to country fans".

== Discography ==
Albums

- The Forester Sisters (1985)
- Perfume, Ribbons & Pearls (1986)
- You Again (1987)
- A Christmas Card (1987)
- Sincerely (1988)
- All I Need (1989)
- Come Hold Me (1990)
- Talkin' 'Bout Men (1991)
- I Got a Date (1992)
- Sunday Meetin' (1993)
- More Than I Am (1996)

Number-one singles (U.S. Billboard Hot Country Songs)

- "I Fell in Love Again Last Night" (1985)
- "Just in Case" (1985–86)
- "Mama's Never Seen Those Eyes" (1986)
- "Too Much Is Not Enough" (1986)
- "You Again" (1987)

== Awards and nominations ==
=== Grammy Awards ===
Year	Nominee / work	Award	Result
1986	The Forester Sisters	Best Country Performance by a Duo or Group with Vocal	Nominated
1989	Sincerely	Best Country Performance by a Duo or Group with Vocal	Nominated
1992	"Men"	Best Country Performance by a Duo or Group with Vocal	Nominated

=== American Music Awards ===
Year	Nominee / work	Award	Result
1987	The Forester Sisters	Favorite Country Band/Duo/Group	Nominated
1987	The Forester Sisters	Favorite Country Band/Duo/Group Video Artist	Nominated

=== Academy of Country Music Awards ===
Year	Nominee / work	Award	Result
1986	The Forester Sisters	Top Vocal Group of the Year	Nominated
1987	The Forester Sisters	Top Vocal Group of the Year	Won

=== Country Music Association Awards ===
Year	Nominee / work	Award	Result
1986	The Forester Sisters	Horizon Award	Nominated
1986	The Forester Sisters	Vocal Group of the Year	Nominated
1988	The Forester Sisters	Vocal Group of the Year	Nominated
