= Just in Case (Exile song) =

Single by The Forester Sisters

from the album The Forester Sisters
- B-side: "Reckless Night"
- Released: November 2, 1985
- Genre: Country
- Length: 2:27
- Label: Warner Bros. Nashville
- Songwriter(s): J.P. Pennington; Sonny LeMaire
- Producer(s): Terry Skinner; J. L. Wallace

The Forester Sisters singles chronology
"I Fell in Love Again Last Night" (1985)	"Just in Case" (1985)	"Mama's Never Seen Those Eyes" (1986)

"Just in Case" is a song written by J.P. Pennington and Sonny LeMaire of the band Exile, who recorded it on their 1984 album Kentucky Hearts. It served as the B-side to the album's single "Crazy for Your Love".

It was covered by American country music group The Forester Sisters. It was released in November 1985 as the third single from the album The Forester Sisters. The song was The Forester Sisters' second number one on the country chart. The single went to number one for one week in 1985.

== Chart performance ==
Chart (1985–1986)	Peak position
US Hot Country Songs (Billboard)	1
Canadian RPM Country Tracks	2
