= I Fell in Love Again Last Night =

Single by The Forester Sisters

from the album The Forester Sisters
- B-side: "Dixie Man"
- Released: June 29, 1985
- Genre: Country
- Length: 3:12
- Label: Warner Bros. Nashville
- Songwriter(s): Paul Overstreet; Thom Schuyler
- Producer(s): Terry Skinner; J. L. Wallace

The Forester Sisters singles chronology
"(That's What You Do) When You're in Love" (1985)	"I Fell in Love Again Last Night" (1985)	"Just in Case" (1986)

"I Fell in Love Again Last Night" is a song written by Paul Overstreet and Thom Schuyler, and recorded by American country music group The Forester Sisters. It was released in June 1985 as the second single from the album The Forester Sisters. The song was The Forester Sisters' second country hit and the first of five number ones on the country chart. The single went to number one for one week and spent a total of fourteen weeks within the Top 40.

== Charts ==
=== Weekly charts ===
Chart (1985)	Peak position
US Hot Country Songs (Billboard)	1
Canadian RPM Country Tracks	3

=== Year-end charts ===
Chart (1985)	Position
US Hot Country Songs (Billboard)	24
