= Moumoon =

Japanese pop duo

- Origin: Japan
- Genres: Pop
- Years active: 2005-present
- Labels: Gate Records (2006); Avex Trax (2007 to 2020); Village Again Association (2021 to present)
- Members: YUKA; Kousuke Masaki
- Website: www.moumoon.net

Moumoon (stylized as moumoon) is a Japanese pop duo comprising YUKA (vocals) and Kousuke Masaki (guitar). The band's name is a portmanteau of the French word "mou" (soft) and the English "moon".

The duo met at a summer rock festival in 2004; after swapping demo tapes, the pair decided to work together professionally. The band self-produced and arrange the vast majority of their songs, with Masaki composing the music while YUKA writes the lyrics.

Both band members were brought up on classical music, with Masaki playing piano and YUKA a keen violinist. Their present musical style covers various types of music such as pop, alternative rock, electronica, folk and indie rock.

A popular band in their native Japan and elsewhere, many of their songs have received massive amounts of radio airplay, and been used in TV commercials and television soundtracks. They tour regularly (including a sequence of "Fullmoon Live" shows every full moon night), and are best known for their 2010 top-ten single, "Sunshine Girl".

== Biography ==
=== 2004–2006: Formation and indies ===
Yuka and Masaki met in summer 2004, but it was not until 2005 that they formed Moumoon. In October 2005, the duo held their first live performance at the Omotesando FAB. In 2006, they signed with the indie label Gate Records and released their debut single "Flowers/Pride". The single charted on the Oricon single charts at number 106. Soon after, Moumoon released their debut mini-album, Flowers (September 2006), which debuted at number 63 on the Oricon album charts.

=== Major debut ===
On May 12, 2010, they released their eighth single, "Sunshine Girl", which entered the Oricon single charts at number 12, a first for the group. The following week the single rose to number 10, becoming their first Top 10 single. The duo released their fourth mini-album, titled Spark, on July 7, 2010.

In 2015, moumoon performed at the SXSW music festival in Austin, Texas, as part of the Japan Nite showcase.

=== 2021–present: Back to indies ===
On November 30, 2020, it was announced that their contract with Avex Trax had expired and the duo decided to not renew it, and they will be working independently again after 13 years of contract with Avex. The band signed a new contract with indie label VAA in July 2021.

On March 27, 2022, it was announced via the group's official Instagram account that Masaki and Yuka had married.

== Discography ==
=== Studio albums ===
No.	Release	Title
1	2008.11.08	moumoon
2	2011.03.02	15 Doors
3	2012.02.08	No Night Land
4	2013.01.30	PAIN KILLER
5	2014.01.29	LOVE before we DIE
6	2015.08.12	It's Our Time
7	2017.03.14	Flyways
8	2019.03.06	Newmoon

=== Concept albums ===
No.	Release	Title
1	2014.06.18	ICE CANDY

=== Mini-albums ===
No.	Release	Title
Indie	2006.09.06	Flowers
1	2007.08.22	love me?
2	2010.03.24	Refrain
3	2010.07.27	SPARK

=== Singles ===
No.	Release	Title
Indie	2006.07.26	Flowers / pride
1	2007.12.05	Do you remember?
2	2008.06.04	Tiny Star
3	2008.10.15	more than love
4	2009.02.25	EVERGREEN
5	2009.07.22	On the right
6	2009.11.25	Aoi Tsuki to Ambivalence na Ai
7	2010.05.12	Sunshine Girl
8	2010.11.10	moonlight / Sky High / YAY
9	2011.08.03	Chu Chu
10	2011.12.14	Uta wo Utaou
11	2012.03.14	"Love is Everywhere"
12	2012.05.02	Wild Child
13	2012.08.29	Hanabi
14	2012.12.12	DREAMER DREAMER / Doko e mo Ikanai yo
15	2014.05.08	Jewel
16	2014.08.27	I'm Scarlet
17	2015.02.25	Hello, shooting-star

=== Special singles ===
No.	Release	Title
1	2010.06.25	Let's dance in the moonlight
2	2010.12.01	my Secret Santa

=== Digital singles ===
No.	Release	Title
1	2007.11.28	Do you remember? (moumoon exclusive Ver.)
2	2008.06.04	Tiny Star Exclusive
3	2008.10.15	more than love ~Special Edition~
4	2009.09.16	Destiny
5	2009.11.25	Aoi Tsuki to Ambivalence na Ai + Acoustic version
6	2010.10.13	One Step
7	2012.10.10	Vanitas
8	2013.10.25	Lovin' You
9	2013.11.06	Emerald no Oka
10	2013.12.17	winter fall
11	2014.01.15	I say You say I You
12	2014.04.16	Jewel
13	2014.08.06	I'm Scarlet
14	2014.10.02	BF
