= Sincerely (song) =

1954 song written by Alan Freed and Harvey Fuqua

Single by The Moonglows
- B-side: "Tempting"
- Released: October 1954
- Recorded: October 1954
- Studio: Universal (Chicago)
- Genre: Doo-wop; pop
- Length: 3:12
- Label: Chess 1581
- Songwriters: Harvey Fuqua, Alan Freed

The Moonglows singles chronology
"219 Train" (1954)	"Sincerely" (1954)	"Most of All" (1955)

"Sincerely"

Single by The McGuire Sisters

from the album By Request
- B-side: "No More"
- Released: November 1954
- Recorded: 1954
- Genre: Traditional pop
- Length: 2:54
- Label: Coral
- Songwriters: Harvey Fuqua, Alan Freed

The McGuire Sisters singles chronology
"Christmas Alphabet" (1954)	"Sincerely" (1954)	"No More" (1955)

"Sincerely" is a popular song written by Harvey Fuqua and Alan Freed and first released by The Moonglows in 1954.

The Moonglows recorded the song during their first session for Chess Records, which took place in October, 1954 at Universal Recording Corporation in Chicago. The Moonglows' version reached number one on the Billboard R&B chart and number 20 on the Billboard Juke Box chart. Co-writing credits were shared by Moonglows band member Fuqua and disk jockey Freed. After it became known that Freed had inappropriately claimed songwriter credits for songs by bands he promoted (associated with his downfall in a payola investigation years later), Fuqua noted that Freed had in fact contributed to the songwriting for "Sincerely", thus his claim to a songwriting credit in this case was legitimate.

== McGuire Sisters cover ==
The best-selling version of "Sincerely" was a pop cover recorded by the McGuire Sisters, which entered the charts in 1954 and reached number one the next year. It was eventually certified as a gold record. This version was featured in the 1982 film Come Back to the 5 & Dime, Jimmy Dean, Jimmy Dean, where Cher, Karen Black and Sandy Dennis lipsync to it.

== Other covers ==
- Pat Boone recorded "Sincerely" as a non-album track and a B-side in 1964.
- In 1988, a cover of the song by the country quartet Forester Sisters reached number eight on the Billboard Hot Country Songs chart.
