= Family Brown discography =

- Studio albums: 11
- Compilation albums: 4
- Singles: 42
- Music videos: 2

The discography of Canadian country music group Family Brown consists of 11 studio albums and 42 singles. Active from 1967 to 1990, the group charted 42 singles on the RPM Country Tracks chart in Canada, including four number one singles. Seven singles also charted on the Billboard Hot Country Singles chart in the U.S., including the top 30 single "But It's Cheating."

== Studio albums ==
Title	Album details	Peak positions
Title	Album details	CAN Country
The Family Brown	Release year: 1971; Label: MCA	—
Portrait	Release year: 1972; Label: RCA	—
Country Way	Release year: 1974; Label: RCA	—
I Am the Words, You Are the Music	Release year: 1976; Label: RCA	—
Believe in Us	Release year: 1978; Label: RCA	11
Familiar Faces, Familiar Places	Release year: 1979; Label: RCA	9
Nothing Really Changes	Release year: 1981; Label: RCA	—
Raised on Country Music	Release year: 1982; Label: RCA	—
Repeat After Me	Release year: 1984; Label: RCA	—
Feel the Fire	Release year: 1985; Label: RCA	—
These Days	Release year: 1988; Label: RCA	29
"—" denotes releases that did not chart

== Compilation albums ==
Title	Album details	Peak positions
Title	Album details	CAN Country
The Best of Country Gospel	Release year: 1979; Label: RCA	7
Best of the Family Brown	Release year: 1980; Label: RCA	18
Life and Times 1982-1989	Release year: 1989; Label: RCA	—
Lassoes 'N Spurs	Release year: 1991; Label: RCA	—
"—" denotes releases that did not chart

== Singles ==
=== 1970s ===
Year	Title	Peak positions		Album
Year	Title	CAN Country	CAN AC	Album
1971	"R.R. #2"	2	—	The Family Brown
1972	"Family Love"	3	4	Portrait
1972	"Yes, Jesus Loves Me"	27	—	Portrait
1973	"The Feeling's Too Strong"	16	45	Portrait
1973	"Ninety Acre Farm"	23	—	Non-album single
1974	"Kids in the Kitchen"	4	—	Non-album single
1974	"Love Is Simple"	14	—	Non-album single
1975	"A Touch of God"	16	—	I Am the Words, You Are the Music
1975	"I Am the Words, You Are the Music"	18	28	I Am the Words, You Are the Music
1976	"Light at the End of the Hall"	24	—	I Am the Words, You Are the Music
1976	"If You Keep Throwing Dirt"	1	—	I Am the Words, You Are the Music
1977	"Sing a Song of Love"	11	—	Believe in Us
1977	"Juke Box Lover"	7	—	Believe in Us
1977	"Lovin' Fool"	10	20	Believe in Us
1978	"You're the Light"	3	25	Familiar Faces, Familiar Places
1978	"Love Is a Contact Sport"	6	—	Familiar Faces, Familiar Places
1979	"The Way I Love You"	26	—	Familiar Faces, Familiar Places
1979	"Stay with Me"	4	20	Familiar Faces, Familiar Places
1979	"Love Was on Our Side"	1	—	Familiar Faces, Familiar Places
"—" denotes releases that did not chart

=== 1980s and 1990s ===
Year	Title	Peak positions			Album
Year	Title	CAN Country	CAN AC	US Country	Album
1980	"But It's Cheating"	1	—	—	Nothing Really Changes
1980	"It's Really Love This Time"	7	—	57	Nothing Really Changes
1981	"Ribbon of Gold"	18	24	—	Nothing Really Changes
1981	"Another Broken Hearted Melody"	10	—	—	Nothing Really Changes
1982	"But It's Cheating" (re-release)	43	—	30	Nothing Really Changes
1982	"Some Never Stand a Chance"	4	27	61	Raised on Country Music
1982	"Raised on Country Music"	9	—	—	Raised on Country Music
1983	"Memorized by Heart"	8	—	—	Raised on Country Music
1983	"We Really Got a Hold on Love"	4	13	67	Repeat After Me
1984	"Repeat After Me"	5	20	56	Repeat After Me
1984	"Did You Know"	32	—	—	Repeat After Me
1984	"Straight Forward Love Affair"	30	26	—	Repeat After Me
1985	"Feel the Fire"	22	—	66	Feel the Fire
1986	"What If It's Right"	8	—	80	Feel the Fire
1986	"Wouldn't You Love Us Together Again" (with Willie Nelson)	46	—	—	Feel the Fire
1987	"I Love You More"	10	—	—	Feel the Fire
1987	"Overnight Success"	21	—	—	Non-album single
1988	"Til I Find My Love"	1	19	—	These Days
1988	"Town of Tears"	7	—	—	These Days
1989	"Let's Build a Life Together"	3	—	—	These Days
1989	"Sure Looks Good"	22	—	—	These Days
1989	"Pioneers"	13	—	—	Life and Times 1982-1989
1990	"How Many Times"	3	—	—	Life and Times 1982-1989
"—" denotes releases that did not chart

== Music videos ==
Year	Video	Director
1984	"Repeat After Me"	Bob Fresco
1989	"Pioneers"	Robert Holbrook
