= 1980 in country music =

This is a list of notable events in country music that took place in the year 1980.

== Events ==
- January 25 — At age 84, octogenarian comedian George Burns becomes by far the oldest performer (to that time) to have a single in the top 40 of Billboard's Hot Country Singles chart with "I Wish I Was 18 Again." The song peaks at No. 15 in March.
- March 2 — The Public Broadcasting Company (PBS) telecasts the Grand Ole Opry for the third time, and this telecast lasts longer than any of the other telecasts. The telecast featured Tom T. Hall, Ronnie Milsap, Roy Acuff, Hank Snow, Minnie Pearl, Porter Wagoner, Billy Grammer, George Hamilton IV, Marty Robbins, and many others. Sissy Spacek also appeared on this telecast with Loretta Lynn, promoting the new movie Coal Miner's Daughter, which opened the next week.
- March — Alabama, a southern rock-influenced band from Fort Payne, Alabama, signs a recording contract with RCA Records, and records its first album, My Home's in Alabama. The album is released in May, and by late in the year, the band was on its way to superstardom.
- April 19 — For the first time in chart history, the top 5 positions on the Billboard Hot Country Singles chart are held (or co-held) by female artists. The list:
1. "It's Like We Never Said Goodbye" by Crystal Gayle
2. "A Lesson in Leavin'" by Dottie West
3. "Are You on the Road to Lovin' Me Again" by Debby Boone
4. "Beneath Still Waters" by Emmylou Harris
5. "Two Story House" by Tammy Wynette (Duet with George Jones)
- July 5 — George Jones' classic "He Stopped Loving Her Today" reaches #1 on the Billboard Hot Country Singles charts.
- November 18 — The country-variety TV series, Barbara Mandrell and the Mandrell Sisters, debuts.

=== Country music goes Hollywood ===
Country music had a major impact on the motion picture industry throughout the year, with no less than four major box office hits released during the year:

- March 7 — Coal Miner's Daughter, the biography of Loretta Lynn told in film, opens. Sissy Spacek wins that year's Academy Award for Best Actress for her portrayal of Lynn; Tommy Lee Jones and Beverly D'Angelo also play leading roles. The movie is a huge success with critics and at the box office, and briefly sparks Spacek's singing career.
- June 6 — The movie Urban Cowboy, starring John Travolta and Debra Winger, opens in American theaters. The movie — which showcases Mickey Gilley's nightclub, Gilley's — is a huge success at the box office ($54 million), and its soundtrack includes several major hits and makes stars out of several of the artists (most notably Johnny Lee), and will have a major impact on the direction of country music of the early 1980s.
- July 18 — Honeysuckle Rose, starring Willie Nelson, opens. Nelson also had a starring role in The Electric Horseman, which opened in December 1979 and continued to be a major box office hit into 1980. Both films' soundtracks featured Nelson songs that became major hits on both the country and (in some cases) pop charts.
- December 19 — 9 to 5 – with Dolly Parton in one of the leading roles – opens. The title song from the movie becomes a No. 1 hit on both the country and pop charts and is a milestone in Parton's acting career.

Additionally, Clint Eastwood continues to cement his association with country music through two films released during the year: Bronco Billy, released in June, and Any Which Way You Can, debuting in December. One of the songs on the Bronco Billy soundtrack was a duet by Merle Haggard and Eastwood, one of three major hits from the movie. Any Which Way You Can also had a soundtrack that spawned several successful hits in late 1980 into early 1981, including the breakthrough hit by David Frizzell and Shelly West.

== Top hits of the year ==
=== Singles released by American artists ===
US	CAN	Single	Artist
17	59	After Hours	Joe Stampley
18	21	Always	Patsy Cline
1	20	Are You on the Road to Lovin' Me Again	Debby Boone
7	7	Baby, You're Something	John Conlee
6	—	Back to Back	Jeanne Pruett
1	1	Bar Room Buddies	Merle Haggard and Clint Eastwood
18	43	Bedroom Ballad	Gene Watson
1	2	Beneath Still Waters	Emmylou Harris
6	9	The Best of Strangers	Barbara Mandrell
7	49	Blue Heartache	Gail Davies
8	4	The Blue Side	Crystal Gayle
21	8	Bombed, Boozed and Busted	Joe Sun
13	8	The Boxer	Emmylou Harris
20	—	Bring It on Home	Big Al Downing
9	14	Broken Trust	Brenda Lee with The Oak Ridge Boys
22	14	The Champ	Moe Bandy
5	27	Charlotte's Web	The Statler Brothers
20	21	Cheatin' on a Cheater	Loretta Lynn
7	1	Clyde	Waylon Jennings
24	7	Coal Miner's Daughter	Sissy Spacek
16	35	Come to My Love	Cristy Lane
15	26	Couldn't Do Nothin' Right	Rosanne Cash
1	1	Coward of the County	Kenny Rogers
1	10	Cowboys and Clowns	Ronnie Milsap
10	8	The Cowgirl and the Dandy	Brenda Lee
3	6	Crackers	Barbara Mandrell
14	53	Crying	Stephanie Winslow
32	8	Dallas	Floyd Cramer
1	4	Dancin' Cowboys	The Bellamy Brothers
1	15	Do You Wanna Go to Heaven	T. G. Sheppard
3	1	Don't Fall in Love with a Dreamer	Kenny Rogers with Kim Carnes
17	—	Drinkin' and Drivin'	Johnny Paycheck
1	2	Drivin' My Life Away	Eddie Rabbitt
3	3	Faded Love	Willie Nelson and Ray Price
14	—	Free to Be Lonely Again	Debby Boone
2	3	Friday Night Blues	John Conlee
1	7	Gone Too Far	Eddie Rabbitt
2	3	Good Ole Boys Like Me	Don Williams
7	16	Hard Times	Lacy J. Dalton
1	2	He Stopped Loving Her Today	George Jones
17	28	He Was There (When I Needed You)	Tammy Wynette
17	20	He's Out of My Life	Johnny Duncan with Janie Fricke
3	3	Heart of Mine	The Oak Ridge Boys
4	1	Help Me Make It Through the Night	Willie Nelson
7	7	Holding the Bag	Moe Bandy and Joe Stampley
1	1	Honky Tonk Blues	Charley Pride
1	1	I Ain't Living Long Like This	Waylon Jennings
1	1	I Believe in You	Don Williams
18	33	I Can See Forever in Your Eyes	Reba McEntire
5	—	I Can't Get Enough of You	Razzy Bailey
20	—	I Don't Want to Lose You	Con Hunley
15	8	I Wish I Was Eighteen Again	George Burns
1	1	I'd Love to Lay You Down	Conway Twitty
1	23	I'll Be Coming Back for More	T. G. Sheppard
8	8	I'll Even Love You (Better Than I Did Then)	The Statler Brothers
5	25	I'm Already Blue	The Kendalls
17	48	I'm Gonna Love You Tonight (In My Dreams)	Johnny Duncan
2	4	I'm Not Ready Yet	George Jones
6	7	I've Never Seen the Likes of You	Conway Twitty
1	3	If You Ever Change Your Mind	Crystal Gayle
13	62	In America	Charlie Daniels
10	4	It's Hard to Be Humble	Mac Davis
1	1	It's Like We Never Said Goodbye	Crystal Gayle
14	35	It's Over	Rex Allen, Jr.
9	—	It's Too Late	Jeanne Pruett
5	2	It's True Love	Loretta Lynn and Conway Twitty
12	8	Kaw-Liga	Hank Williams Jr.
1	2	Lady	Kenny Rogers
12	39	The Last Cowboy Song	Ed Bruce
13	—	Lay Back in the Arms of Someone	Randy Barlow
13	—	Leavin's for Unbelievers	Dottie West
1	1	Leaving Louisiana in the Broad Daylight	The Oak Ridge Boys
1	23	A Lesson in Leavin'	Dottie West
6	17	Let's Get It While the Getting's Good	Eddy Arnold
10	15	Let's Keep it That Way	Mac Davis
17	—	A Little Getting Used To	Mickey Gilley
27	16	Long Haired Country Boy	Charlie Daniels
1	18	Lookin' for Love	Johnny Lee
14	57	Losing Kind of Love	Lacy J. Datlon
1	1	Love Me Over Again	Don Williams
4	1	Love the World Away	Kenny Rogers
3	30	Lovers Live Longer	The Bellamy Brothers
1	10	Loving Up a Storm	Razzy Bailey
6	12	Lying Time Again	Mel Tillis
2	38	Making Plans	Porter Wagoner and Dolly Parton
12	—	Man Just Doesn't Know What a Woman Goes Through	Charlie Rich
7	12	Men	Charly McClain
6	1	Midnight Rider	Willie Nelson
3	4	Misery and Gin	Merle Haggard
2	2	Missin' You	Charley Pride
5	46	Morning Comes Too Early	Jim Ed Brown and Helen Cornelius
1	13	My Heart	Ronnie Milsap
1	1	My Heroes Have Always Been Cowboys	Willie Nelson
17	—	My Home's in Alabama	Alabama
30	11	Naked in the Rain	Loretta Lynn
18	10	New York Wine and Tennessee Shine	Dave & Sugar
20	11	Night Games	Ray Stevens
20	9	Night Life	Willie Nelson with Danny Davis and the Nashville Brass
13	22	No One Will Ever Know	Gene Watson
17	16	North of the Border	Johnny Rodriguez
4	3	Nothing Sure Looked Good on You	Gene Watson
11	26	Numbers	Bobby Bare
6	40	Oh, How I Miss You Tonight	Jim Reeves and Deborah Allen
1	2	Old Flames Can't Hold a Candle to You	Dolly Parton
6	58	Old Habits	Hank Williams Jr.
9	9	The Old Side of Town	Tom T. Hall
1	2	On the Road Again	Willie Nelson
1	10	One Day at a Time	Cristy Lane
1	8	One in a Million	Johnny Lee
13	—	One of a Kind	Moe Bandy
10	—	Over	Leon Everette
10	18	Over the Rainbow	Jerry Lee Lewis
19	59	A Pair of Old Sneakers	George Jones and Tammy Wynette
22	12	Pass Me By (If You're Only Passing Through)	Janie Fricke
10	7	Pecos Promenade	Tanya Tucker
17	31	Play Another Slow Song	Johnny Duncan
5	3	Pour Me Another Tequila	Eddie Rabbitt
35	13	Pregnant Again	Loretta Lynn
9	5	Put It Off Until Tomorrow	The Kendalls
21	18	Rainy Days and Stormy Nights	Billie Jo Spears
15	—	Raisin' Cane in Texas	Gene Watson
38	20	The Real Buddy Holly Story	Sonny Curtis
20	17	Real Cowboy (You Say You're)	Billy Crash Craddock
8	—	Save Your Heart for Me	Jacky Ward
2	11	She Can't Say That Anymore	John Conlee
13	60	She Just Started Liking Cheatin' Songs	John Anderson
23	13	Shotgun Rider	Joe Sun
7	2	Shriner's Convention	Ray Stevens
13	21	The Shuffle Song	Margo Smith
1	8	Smoky Mountain Rain	Ronnie Milsap
6	7	Smooth Sailin'	T. G. Sheppard
1	3	Stand by Me	Mickey Gilley
15	9	Standing Tall	Billie Jo Spears
17	41	Starting Over	Tammy Wynette
1	2	Starting Over Again	Dolly Parton
9	—	Steppin' Out	Mel Tillis
1	2	Sugar Daddy	The Bellamy Brothers
12	13	Sugarfoot Rag	Jerry Reed
15	—	Sure Thing	Freddie Hart
8	16	Sweet Sexy Eyes	Cristy Lane
10	—	Take Me in Your Arms and Hold Me	Jim Reeves and Deborah Allen
5	12	Take Me to Your Lovin' Place	Larry Gatlin & the Gatlin Brothers
12	15	Taking Somebody with Me When I Fall	Larry Gatlin & the Gatlin Brothers
11	15	Tell Ole I Ain't Here, He Better Get on Home	Moe Bandy and Joe Stampley
5	25	Temporarily Yours	Jeanne Pruett
1	1	Tennessee River	Alabama
18	43	The Tennessee Waltz	Lacy J. Dalton
9	40	Texas in My Rear View Mirror	Mac Davis
6	3	That Lovin' You Feelin' Again	Roy Orbison and Emmylou Harris
1	9	That's All That Matters	Mickey Gilley
7	—	That's the Way a Cowboy Rocks and Rolls	Jacky Ward
10	50	That's What I Get for Loving You	Eddy Arnold
1	2	Theme from The Dukes of Hazzard (Good Ol' Boys)	Waylon Jennings
18	36	There's Another Woman	Joe Stampley
19	—	They Never Lost You	Con Hunley
13	—	Too Old to Play Cowboy	Razzy Bailey
1	1	True Love Ways	Mickey Gilley
1	1	Trying to Love Two Women	The Oak Ridge Boys
10	—	Tumbleweed	Sylvia
2	1	Two Story House	George Jones & Tammy Wynette
2	1	The Way I Am	Merle Haggard
7	1	Wayfaring Stranger	Emmylou Harris
18	15	We're Number One	Larry Gatlin and the Gatlin Brothers
19	33	What'll I Tell Virginia	Johnny Rodriguez
15	17	When	Slim Whitman
11	15	When Two Worlds Collide	Jerry Lee Lewis
1	2	Why Don't You Spend the Night	Ronnie Milsap
1	3	Why Lady Why	Alabama
18	23	Women Get Lonely	Charly McClain
5	9	Women I've Never Had	Hank Williams Jr.
1	1	Years	Barbara Mandrell
10	6	Yesterday Once More	Moe Bandy
4	5	You Almost Slipped My Mind	Charley Pride
9	5	You Know Just What I'd Do	Loretta Lynn and Conway Twitty
19	19	You Lay a Whole Lot of Love on Me	Con Hunley
8	22	(You Lift Me) Up to Heaven	Reba McEntire
1	2	You Win Again	Charley Pride
5	17	You'd Make an Angel Wanna Cheat	The Kendalls
22	8	You're Gonna Love Yourself	Charlie Rich
60	12	You're Only Lonely	JD Souther
3	32	Your Body Is an Outlaw	Mel Tillis
15	39	Your Lying Blue Eyes	John Anderson
5	5	Your Old Cold Shoulder	Crystal Gayle

=== Singles released by Canadian artists ===
US	CAN	Single	Artist
—	10	All Her Letters	Terry Carisse
—	10	The Ballad of Lucy Jordan	Marie Bottrell
—	14	The Ballad of T.J.'s	Dick Damron
—	15	Brown Eyed Girl	The Good Brothers
—	1	But It's Cheating	Family Brown
—	13	Casey's Last Ride	Bytown Bluegrass
—	16	Caught in the Middle	Jack Hennig
1	1	Could I Have This Dance	Anne Murray
3	1	Daydream Believer	Anne Murray
—	20	Dollars	Dick Damron
—	4	Don't Ask the Question	Canadian Zephyr
80	8	Dream Street Rose	Gordon Lightfoot
—	8	Evangeline	C-Weed Band
—	6	Flames of Evil Desire	Marie Bottrell
—	1	Guess I Went Crazy	Canadian Zephyr
—	10	Hard Times (Comin' Down Again)	Carlton Showband
—	1	Hollywood Love	Carroll Baker
—	4	I Think I'll Say Goodbye	Eddie Eastman
—	15	I Wish You Could Have Turned My Head	Mercey Brothers
—	10	I'd Rather Be in L.A.	Gurney Anderson
23	10	I'm Happy Just to Dance with You	Anne Murray
—	9	In My Eyes	Glory-Anne Carriere
—	14	Liftin' Me Up, Lettin' Me Down	Eddie Eastman
—	1	Love Was on Our Side	Family Brown
9	4	Lucky Me	Anne Murray
—	7	Meant to Be	R. Harlan Smith and Chris Nielsen
—	10	My Broken Old Heart	David Thompson
—	3	Phantom of the Opry	Ronnie Prophet
—	20	Rideau Street Queen	Wayne Rostad
—	18	Somebody's Woman	Ralph Carlson
—	20	Sorry Doesn't Always Make It Right	Iris Larratt
—	1	Sparkle in Her Eyes	Terry Carisse
—	3	The Star	Marie Bottrell
—	1	Still Falling in Love	Carroll Baker
—	9	Sweet Mountain Music	Laura Vinson
—	6	Thanks for the Dance	Ralph Carlson
—	10	We Could Make Beautiful Music Together	Terry Carisse
—	4	We've Got the Magic	R. Harlan Smith
—	16	What's Forever For	Cliff Edwards
—	7	Your Used to Be	Eddie Eastman

== Top new album releases ==
US	CAN	Album	Artist	Record label
	10	6 Cylinder	6 Cylinder	RCA
1	3	9 to 5 and Odd Jobs	Dolly Parton	RCA
13		10th Anniversary	The Statler Brothers	Mercury
	6	All for the Love of a Song	Carroll Baker	RCA
	24	American Son	Levon Helm	MCA
2	1	Anne Murray's Greatest Hits	Anne Murray	Capitol
5	7	Any Which Way You Can (Soundtrack)	Various Artists	Warner Bros.
14		Ask Me to Dance	Cristy Lane	United Artists
8		Back to the Barrooms	Merle Haggard	MCA
	12	Back to the Sod	Carlton Showband	RCA
	18	Best Country Duets	Various Artists	Epic
57	21	The Best of Jerry Jeff Walker	Jerry Jeff Walker	MCA
	18	Best of the Family Brown	Family Brown	RCA
	11	Best of the Good Brothers	The Good Brothers	RCA
20		Blue Pearl	Earl Thomas Conley	Sunbird
10		Bronco Billy (Soundtrack)	Various Artists	Elektra
57	6	The Champ	Moe Bandy	Columbia
2	1	Coal Miner's Daughter (Soundtrack)	Various Artists	MCA
	8	Come with Me	Nana Mouskouri	Grand
7	2	A Country Collection	Anne Murray	Capitol
16		Crying	Stephanie Winslow	Warner Bros./Curb
14		Danny Davis & Willie Nelson with the Nashville Brass	Danny Davis & The Nashville Brass & Willie Nelson	RCA
7	1	Dolly, Dolly, Dolly	Dolly Parton	RCA
21	4	Down & Dirty	Bobby Bare	Columbia
58	1	Dream Street Rose	Gordon Lightfoot	Warner Bros.
47	17	Drunk & Crazy	Bobby Bare	Columbia
22		Ed Bruce	Ed Bruce	MCA
	9	Eddie Eastman	Eddie Eastman	Columbia
8	2	Elvis Aron Presley	Elvis Presley	RCA
14		Encore	Mickey Gilley	Epic
	18	The Entertainer	Artie MacLaren	Broadland
16	11	Friday Night Blues	John Conlee	MCA
5	9	Full Moon	Charlie Daniels	Epic
1	1	Gideon	Kenny Rogers	United Artists
22		Greatest Hits	Larry Gatlin and the Gatlin Brothers	Columbia
1	10	Greatest Hits	Ronnie Milsap	RCA
5	13	Greatest Hits	The Oak Ridge Boys	MCA
1	2	Greatest Hits	Kenny Rogers	Liberty
	18	Gypsy	Johnny Rodriguez	Epic
4	7	Habits Old and New	Hank Williams, Jr.	Elektra/Curb
18		Hard Times	Lacy J. Dalton	Columbia
10	3	Heart & Soul	Conway Twitty	MCA
11	13	Help Yourself	Larry Gatlin and the Gatlin Brothers	Columbia
1	4	Honeysuckle Rose	Willie Nelson	Columbia
1	5	Horizon	Eddie Rabbitt	Elektra
7		I Am What I Am	George Jones	Epic
2	3	I Believe in You	Don Williams	MCA
12		I Wish I Was Eighteen Again	George Burns	Mercury
	18	Into a Mystery	Murray McLauchlan	True North
	22	Iris Larratt	Iris Larratt	RCA
3		It's Hard to Be Humble	Mac Davis	Casablanca
	23	King of the Newfies	Michael T. Wall	Boot
11		Lacy J. Dalton	Lacy J. Dalton	Columbia
	4	Live	The Good Brothers	Solid Gold
8	6	Lookin' for Love	Johnny Lee	Asylum
17		Lookin' Good	Loretta Lynn	MCA
24	5	Loretta	Loretta Lynn	MCA
17		Love Has No Reason	Debby Boone	Warner Bros./Curb
6	12	Love Is Fair	Barbara Mandrell	MCA
24		M-M-Mel Live	Mel Tillis	MCA
	12	Make a Little Magic	Nitty Gritty Dirt Band	Liberty
3		Milsap Magic	Ronnie Milsap	RCA
1	1	Music Man	Waylon Jennings	RCA
3	1	My Home's in Alabama	Alabama	RCA
9		Porter & Dolly	Porter Wagoner & Dolly Parton	RCA
12		Razzy	Razzy Bailey	RCA
12	16	Rest Your Love on Me	Conway Twitty	MCA
	23	Rockabilly Blues	Johnny Cash	Columbia
2	2	Roses in the Snow	Emmylou Harris	Warner Bros.
	1	The Rovers	The Rovers	Attic
3	1	San Antonio Rose	Willie Nelson & Ray Price	Columbia
	20	She Don't Like the Highway	Dale Russell	Sunshine
4		Shriner's Convention	Ray Stevens	RCA
10	11	Smokey and the Bandit II (Soundtrack)	Various Artists	MCA
19		Smooth Sailin'	T. G. Sheppard	Warner Bros./Curb
15	1	Somebody's Waiting	Anne Murray	Capitol
25	24	Songs I Love to Sing	Slim Whitman	Cleveland Int'l.
18		Sons of the Sun	The Bellamy Brothers	Warner Bros./Curb
22		Southern Rain	Mel Tillis	Elektra
	3	The Star	Marie Bottrell	MBS
12		Texas in My Rear View Mirror	Mac Davis	Casablanca
8		That's All That Matters to Me	Mickey Gilley	Epic
1		There's a Little Bit of Hank in Me	Charley Pride	RCA
6		These Days	Crystal Gayle	Columbia
10	1	Together	The Oak Ridge Boys	MCA
	22	True Feelings	Sonny Sinclair	Rural Root
1	2	Urban Cowboy (Soundtrack)	Various Artists	Asylum
16		The Way I Am	Merle Haggard	MCA
	13	We Could Make Beautiful Music Together	Terry Carisse	MBS
	5	With Love	Marty Robbins	Columbia
9		You Can Get Crazy	The Bellamy Brothers	Warner Bros./Curb
25		Your Body Is an Outlaw	Mel Tillis	Elektra
	2	Zephyr	Canadian Zephyr	RCA

=== Other top albums ===
US	CAN	Album	Artist	Record label
60		After Hours	Joe Stampley	Epic
27		Always	Patsy Cline	MCA
28		Autograph	John Denver	RCA
43		The Best of Chet on the Road — Live	Chet Atkins	RCA
34		The Best of the Kendalls	The Kendalls	Ovation
64		But What Will the Neighbors Think	Rodney Crowell	Warner Bros.
49		Cactus and a Rose	Gary Stewart	RCA
71		Changes	Billy "Crash" Craddock	Capitol
47		Christmas with Slim Whitman	Slim Whitman	Cleveland Int'l.
29		Dallas	Floyd Cramer	RCA Victor
51		Don't It Break Your Heart	Con Hunley	Warner Bros.
45		Double Trouble	George Jones & Johnny Paycheck	Epic
41		Dreamlovers	Tanya Tucker	MCA
37		Even Cowgirls Get the Blues	Lynn Anderson	Columbia
55		Eyes	Eddy Raven	Dimension
26		Family Bible	Willie Nelson	MCA
37		Favorites	Crystal Gayle	United Artists
44		Following the Feeling	Moe Bandy	Columbia
40		The Game	Gail Davies	Warner Bros.
59		Greatest Country Hits of the 70's	Various Artists	Columbia
61		I Don't Want to Lose	Leon Everette	Orlando
29		I Don't Want to Lose You	Con Hunley	Warner Bros.
27		I'll Be There	Gail Davies	Warner Bros.
28		I'll Need Someone to Hold Me When I Cry	Janie Fricke	Columbia
66		I've Got Something to Say	David Allan Coe	Columbia
61		In My Dreams	Johnny Duncan	Columbia
56		Jerry Reed Sings Jim Croce	Jerry Reed	RCA
61		John Anderson	John Anderson	Warner Bros.
35		Killer Country	Jerry Lee Lewis	Elektra
26		A Legend and His Lady	Eddy Arnold	RCA
59		Love So Many Ways	Ronnie McDowell	Epic
61		Many Moods of Mel	Mel Street	Sunbird
48		New York Town	Johnny Paycheck	Epic
47		New York Wine Tennessee Shine	Dave Rowland & Sugar	RCA
45		No One Will Ever Know	Gene Watson	Capitol
69		Oklahoma Rose	Rex Allen, Jr.	Warner Bros.
52		Once a Drifter	Charlie Rich	Elektra
35		One Man, One Woman	Jim Ed Brown & Helen Cornelius	RCA
37		Only Lonely Sometimes	Tammy Wynette	Epic
70		Standing Tall	Billie Jo Spears	United Artists
52		A Sure Thing	Freddie Hart	Sunbird
30		Take Me Back	Brenda Lee	MCA
43		Texas Bound and Flyin'	Jerry Reed	RCA
56		There's Always Me	Jim Reeves	RCA
26		Together Again	George Jones & Tammy Wynette	Epic
32		When Two Worlds Collide	Jerry Lee Lewis	Elektra
31		Where Did the Money Go?	Hoyt Axton	Jeremiah
28		Who's Cheatin' Who	Charly McClain	Epic
73		Women Get Lonely	Charly McClain	Epic

== On television ==
=== Regular series ===
- Barbara Mandrell and the Mandrell Sisters (1980–1982, NBC)
- Hee Haw (1969–1993, syndicated)
- Pop! Goes the Country (1974–1982, syndicated)
- The Porter Wagoner Show (1960–1981, syndicated)
- That Nashville Music (1970–1985, syndicated)

== Births ==
- April 1 – Kip Moore, country singer of the 2010s.
- April 2 – Bobby Estell, radio personality of the 2010s-onward who uses the on-air name Bobby Bones and host of his eponymously named show.
- July 3 – Sarah Buxton, singer-songwriter best known as co-writer of "Stupid Boy."
- October 18 — Josh Gracin, rose to fame as fourth-place contestant on American Idol in 2003; had a string of hits thereafter ("I Want to Live," "Nothin' to Lose").

== Deaths ==
- March 17 – Hugh Farr, 76, member of the Sons of the Pioneers.
- April 4 — Red Sovine, 62, best known for recitations of truck driving life (car accident resulting from a heart attack).
- June 16 – Bob Nolan, 72, member of the Sons of the Pioneers.

== Country Music Hall of Fame Inductees ==
- Johnny Cash (1932–2003)
- Connie B. Gay (1914–1989)
- Original Sons of the Pioneers (Roy Rogers 1911–1998, Bob Nolan 1908–1980, Lloyd Perryman 1917–1977, Tim Spencer 1908–1974, Hugh Farr 1903–1980 and Karl Farr 1909–1961)

== Major awards ==
=== Grammy Awards ===
- Best Female Country Vocal Performance — "Could I Have This Dance", Anne Murray
- Best Male Country Vocal Performance — "He Stopped Loving Her Today", George Jones
- Best Country Performance by a Duo or Group with Vocal — "That Lovin' You Feelin' Again", Emmylou Harris and Roy Orbison
- Best Country Instrumental Performance — "Orange Blossom Special/Hoedown", Gilley's Urban Cowboy Band
- Best Country Song — "On the Road Again," Willie Nelson (Performer: Willie Nelson)

=== Juno Awards ===
- Country Male Vocalist of the Year — Murray McLauchlan
- Country Female Vocalist of the Year — Anne Murray
- Country Group or Duo of the Year — The Good Brothers

=== Academy of Country Music ===
- Entertainer of the Year — Barbara Mandrell
- Song of the Year — "He Stopped Loving Her Today", Bobby Braddock and Curly Putman (Performer: George Jones)
- Single of the Year — "He Stopped Loving Her Today", George Jones
- Album of the Year — Urban Cowboy, Soundtrack
- Top Male Vocalist — George Jones
- Top Female Vocalist — Dolly Parton
- Top New Male Vocalist — Johnny Lee
- Top New Female Vocalist — Terri Gibbs

=== Country Music Association ===
- Founding President's Award (formerly Connie B. Gay Award) — Charlie Daniels
- Entertainer of the Year — Barbara Mandrell
- Song of the Year — "He Stopped Loving Her Today", Bobby Braddock and Curly Putman (Performer: George Jones)
- Single of the Year — "He Stopped Loving Her Today", George Jones
- Album of the Year — Coal Miner's Daughter, Soundtrack
- Male Vocalist of the Year — George Jones
- Female Vocalist of the Year — Emmylou Harris
- Vocal Duo of the Year — Moe Bandy and Joe Stampley
- Vocal Group of the Year — The Statler Brothers
- Instrumentalist of the Year — Roy Clark
- Instrumental Group of the Year — Charlie Daniels Band

=== Hollywood Walk of Fame ===
Country stars who got a star in 1980

Anne Murray

== Other links ==
- Country Music Association
- Inductees of the Country Music Hall of Fame
