= List of RPM number-one country singles of 1980 =

These are the Canadian number-one country songs of 1980, per the RPM Country Tracks chart. NOTE: Beginning September 13, RPM published biweekly charts through the end of the year.

Issue date	Title	Artist
January 5	(No Chart Published)	
January 12	Coward of the County	Kenny Rogers
January 19	Coward of the County	Kenny Rogers
January 26	Coward of the County	Kenny Rogers
February 2	Help Me Make It Through the Night	Willie Nelson
February 9	Leaving Louisiana in the Broad Daylight	The Oak Ridge Boys
February 16	Love Me Over Again	Don Williams
February 23	Sparkle in Her Eyes	Terry Carisse
March 1	Love Was on Our Side	Family Brown
March 8	Years	Barbara Mandrell
March 15	Years	Barbara Mandrell
March 22	Daydream Believer	Anne Murray
March 29	My Heroes Have Always Been Cowboys	Willie Nelson
April 5	My Heroes Have Always Been Cowboys	Willie Nelson
April 12	I Ain't Living Long Like This	Waylon Jennings
April 19	I'd Love to Lay You Down	Conway Twitty
April 26	Honky Tonk Blues	Charley Pride
May 3	Two Story House	George Jones and Tammy Wynette
May 10	It's Like We Never Said Goodbye	Crystal Gayle
May 17	The Way I Am	Merle Haggard
May 24	The Way I Am	Merle Haggard
May 31	Don't Fall in Love with a Dreamer	Kenny Rogers and Kim Carnes
June 7	Don't Fall in Love with a Dreamer	Kenny Rogers and Kim Carnes
June 14	Don't Fall in Love with a Dreamer	Kenny Rogers and Kim Carnes
June 21	Don't Fall in Love with a Dreamer	Kenny Rogers and Kim Carnes
June 28	Trying to Love Two Women	The Oak Ridge Boys
July 5	Midnight Rider	Willie Nelson
July 12	Midnight Rider	Willie Nelson
July 19	Bar Room Buddies	Merle Haggard and Clint Eastwood
July 26	Bar Room Buddies	Merle Haggard and Clint Eastwood
August 2	Hollywood Love	Carroll Baker
August 9	Clyde	Waylon Jennings
August 16	True Love Ways	Mickey Gilley
August 23	The Wayfaring Stranger	Emmylou Harris
August 30	Love the World Away	Kenny Rogers
September 6	Love the World Away	Kenny Rogers
September 13	Tennessee River	Alabama
September 20	(No Chart Published)	
September 27	But It's Cheating	Family Brown
October 4	(No Chart Published)	
October 11	Guess I Went Crazy	Canadian Zephyr
October 18	(No Chart Published)	
October 25	I Believe in You	Don Williams
November 1	(No Chart Published)	
November 8	I Believe in You	Don Williams
November 15	(No Chart Published)	
November 22	Could I Have This Dance	Anne Murray
November 29	(No Chart Published)	
December 6	Could I Have This Dance	Anne Murray
December 13	(No Chart Published)	
December 20	Still Falling in Love	Carroll Baker
December 27	(No Chart Published)	

== See also ==
- 1980 in music
- List of number-one country singles of 1980 (U.S.)
