= Life and Times 1982–1989 =

Compilation album by Family Brown
- Released: 1989
- Genre: Country
- Label: RCA Records
- Producer: Various

Family Brown chronology
These Days (1988)	Life and Times 1982–1989 (1989)	Lassoes 'N Spurs (1991)

Life and Times 1982–1989 is the third compilation album by Canadian country music group Family Brown. It was released by RCA Records in 1989. The album includes eight previously released songs and two newly recorded tracks, "Pioneers" and "How Many Times". "Pioneers" won two awards at the 1990 Canadian Country Music Association Awards including SOCAN Song of the Year and Video of the Year.

== Track listing ==
All songs written by Barry Brown except where noted.

No.	Title	Writer(s)	Length
1.	"Pioneers"		3:32
2.	"Town of Tears"	Brown, Bruce Campbell, Randall Prescott	2:48
3.	"Til I Find My Love"		3:52
4.	"Raised on Country Music"		3:23
5.	"How Many Times"		2:54
6.	"Sure Looks Good"	Prescott	2:55
7.	"We Really Got a Hold on Love"	Michael Foster, Tony Brown	3:15
8.	"I Love You More"		3:08
9.	"Wouldn't You Love Us Together Again"	Rayburn Anthony, Gene Dobbins, Charlie Thompson	3:33
10.	"Repeat After Me"		3:01
