= Best of the Family Brown =

Compilation album by Family Brown
- Released: 1980
- Genre: Country
- Label: RCA Records
- Producer: Various

Family Brown chronology
Familiar Faces, Familiar Places (1979)	Best of the Family Brown (1980)	Nothing Really Changes (1981)

Best of the Family Brown is the second compilation album by Canadian country music group Family Brown. It was released by RCA Records in 1980.

== Track listing ==
No.	Title	Writer(s)	Length
1.	"You're the Light"	Barry Brown	2:12
2.	"Lovin' Fool"	Brown	2:52
3.	"I'm Available"	Dave Burgess	2:17
4.	"Family Love"	Brown	2:38
5.	"Stay with Me"	J.P. Pennington	2:38
6.	"Amazing Grace"	John Newton
7.	"Juke Box Lover"	Brown	2:45
8.	"Love Was on Our Side"
9.	"Heaven's Just a Sin Away"	Jerry Gillespie	2:17
10.	"The Feeling's Too Strong"
11.	"How Great Thou Art"	Stuart K. Hine
12.	"Poor Man's Crown"

== Chart performance ==
Chart (1980)	Peak position
Canadian RPM Country Albums	18
