= Repeat After Me (disambiguation) =

Repeat After Me may refer to:

- Repeat After Me, a 1984 album by Family Brown
  - "Repeat After Me" (song), its title track
- Repeat After Me (TV series), an American hidden camera television series
- "Repeat After Me (Interlude)", a 2020 song by the Weeknd
- Repeat After Me (tool), an Apple developer tool
