= These Days (Family Brown album) =

Studio album by Family Brown
- Released: 1988
- Genre: Country
- Label: RCA Records
- Producer: Randall Prescott

Family Brown chronology
Feel the Fire (1985)	These Days (1988)	Life and Times 1982-1989 (1989)

These Days is the eleventh and final studio album by Canadian country music group Family Brown. The album was released in 1988 by RCA Records and is the group's first album following the death of founding member Joe Brown, who died in 1986. The album includes the singles "Til I Find My Love", "Town of Tears", "Let's Build a Life Together", and "Sure Looks Good", which all charted on the RPM Country Tracks chart in Canada. "Town of Tears" won two awards at the 1989 Canadian Country Music Association Awards including Single of the Year and SOCAN Song of the Year.

== Track listing ==
No.	Title	Writer(s)	Length
1.	"Til I Find My Love"	Barry Brown
2.	"Closer to Me"
3.	"Town of Tears"	Brown, Bruce Campbell, Randall Prescott
4.	"Let's Build a Life Together"
5.	"Sure Looks Good"	Prescott
6.	"Family Man"
7.	"You've Got Me Loving You"
8.	"Another Street, Another Town"
9.	"Willow Don't You Sleep"
10.	"Just a Little Bit of Love"	Ed Bimm, Brown, Prescott

== Chart performance ==
Chart (1989)	Peak position
Canadian RPM Country Albums	29
