= Feel the Fire (Family Brown album) =

Studio album by Family Brown
- Released: 1985
- Genre: Country
- Label: RCA Records
- Producers: Sam Durrence; Neil Wilburn

Family Brown chronology
Repeat After Me (1984)	Feel the Fire (1985)	These Days (1988)

Feel the Fire is the tenth studio album by Canadian country music group Family Brown. It was released in 1985 by RCA Records and was the final album to include founding member Joe Brown, who died in 1986. The album includes the singles, "Feel the Fire", "What If It's Right", "Wouldn't You Love Us Together Again", and "I Love You More", which all charted on the RPM Country Tracks chart in Canada. The album won the awards for Album of the Year at the 1985 RPM Big Country Awards and the 1986 Canadian Country Music Association Awards.

== Track listing ==
No.	Title	Writer(s)	Length
1.	"Feel the Fire"	Danny Hogan, Don Singleton, Rick Yancey	2:37
2.	"Wouldn't You Love Us Together Again"	Rayburn Anthony, Gene Dobbins, Charlie Thompson	3:30
3.	"Is the Pleasure Worth the Pain"	David Carr, Doug Gilmore, Jim Hurt	4:10
4.	"I Think About You"	Dennis Linde, Alan Rush	2:57
5.	"Comin' from a Blue Place"	Jerry Hayes, Hogan, Yancey	3:23
6.	"It's Looking Like Rain"	Ben Peters	3:37
7.	"I Love You More"	Barry Brown	3:04
8.	"What If It's Right"	Brown	2:49
9.	"A Night Quite Like Tonight"	Brown, Eric Emerson	3:35
10.	"Love Goes On"	Len Chera, Bob Morrison	3:33
