= If You Keep Throwing Dirt =

Single by Family Brown

from the album I Am the Words, You Are the Music
- B-side: "I Believe In Music"
- Released: July 1976
- Recorded: 1976
- Studio: RCA Victor Studio, Toronto, Ontario
- Genre: Country
- Length: 2:43
- Label: RCA
- Composer(s): Barry Brown
- Producer(s): Jack Feeney

Family Brown singles chronology
"Light at the End of the Hall" (1976)	"If You Keep Throwing Dirt" (1976)	"Sing a Song of Love" (1977)

"If You Keep Throwing Dirt" is a song by Canadian country music group Family Brown. The song was released as a single in 1976. It reached number one on the RPM Country Tracks chart in Canada in October 1976.

== Chart performance ==
Chart (1976)	Peak position
Canadian RPM Country Tracks	1
