= Raised on Country Music =

Studio album by Family Brown
- Released: 1982
- Genre: Country
- Label: RCA
- Producer: Jack Feeney

Family Brown chronology
Nothing Really Changes (1982)	Raised on Country Music (1982)	Repeat After Me (1984)

Raised on Country Music is the eighth studio album by Canadian country music group Family Brown. It was released in 1982 by RCA Records and includes the singles, "Some Never Stand a Chance," "Raised on Country Music," and "Memorized by Heart," which all charted on the RPM Country Tracks chart in Canada. The album won the award for Album of the Year at the 1982 and 1983 Canadian Country Music Association Awards.

== Track listing ==
All songs written by Barry Brown except where noted.

No.	Title	Writer(s)	Length
1.	"Raised on Country Music"		3:20
2.	"Gentle Man"		4:10
3.	"Wasn't That Love"	Mitch Johnson; Harry Shannon	2:29
4.	"Arkansas Traveller"		3:09
5.	"Don't Tempt Me"	Joe Brown	2:58
6.	"Some Never Stand a Chance"		2:40
7.	"Memorized by Heart"
8.	"Straight Forward Love Affair"		3:00
9.	"The Little Lady"
10.	"I Can't Complain I Guess"		2:47
