= There You Go (disambiguation) =

"There You Go" is a 2000 song by Pink.

There You Go may also refer to:

- "There You Go" (Exile song), 1990
- "There You Go" (Johnny Cash song), 1956
- "There You Go" (Prescott-Brown song), 1994
- "There You Go", a song by Caedmon's Call from 40 Acres, 1999
- "There You Go", a song by Change of Heart, 1992
- "There U Go", a song by Johnny Gill from the Boomerang film soundtrack, 1992
- "(There You Go) Tellin' Me No Again", a song by Keith Sweat from Keep It Comin', 1991
