= When You're Not Loving Me =

Single by Tracey Prescott & Lonesome Daddy

from the album Tracey Prescott & Lonesome Daddy
- Released: 1992
- Genre: Country
- Length: 3:39
- Label: Columbia
- Songwriter: Barry Brown
- Producer: Randall Prescott

Tracey Prescott & Lonesome Daddy singles chronology
"When You're Not Loving Me" (1992)	"Something Big" (1992)

"When You're Not Loving Me" is a song recorded by Canadian country music group Tracey Prescott & Lonesome Daddy. It was released in 1992 as the first single from their debut album, Tracey Prescott & Lonesome Daddy. It peaked at number 8 on the RPM Country Tracks chart in August 1992.

== Chart performance ==
Chart (1992)	Peak position
Canada Country Singles (RPM)	8

=== Year-end charts ===
Chart (1992)	Position
Canada Country Tracks (RPM)	51
