= List of awards and nominations received by Brenda Lee =

Brenda Lee awards and nominations
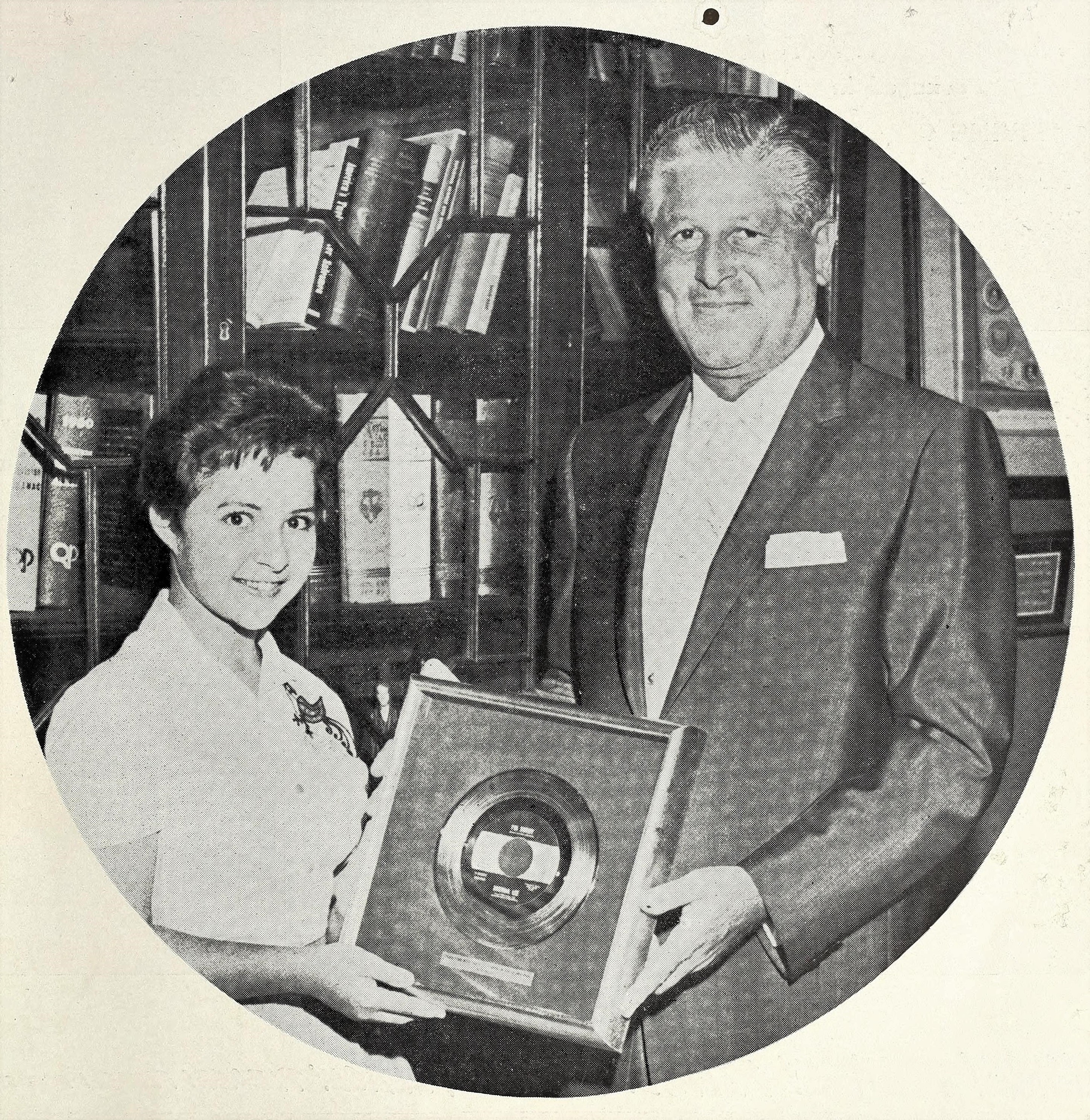
- Brenda Lee on the cover of Cash Box in 1960.
Awards and nominations
Award	Wins	Nominations
Grammy Awards	1	4
Cash Box Magazine Awards	3	7
Hall of fame inductions	5	0

Totals (Note: Certain award groups do not simply award one winner. They acknowledge several different recipients, have runners-up, and have third place. Since this is a specific recognition and is different from losing an award, runner-up mentions are considered wins in this award tally. For simplification and to avoid errors, each award in this list has been presumed to have had a prior nomination.)
- Wins: 12

American singer Brenda Lee has received various awards and inductions over the course of her career. This includes four nominations from the Grammy Awards. She was nominated for her first Grammy in 1960 for the song "I'm Sorry". She was later given their Lifetime Achievement Award in 2009. The foundation later inducted Lee's "Rockin' Around the Christmas Tree" into the Grammy Hall of Fame in 2019. Lee has also won three awards from Cash Box magazine, including Best Female Vocalist. She was nominated for seven more additional awards during the 1960s.

Lee's first induction was into the Georgia Music Hall of Fame in 1982. She was given an induction into the Country Music Hall of Fame in 1997 and then the Rock and Roll Hall of Fame in 2002.

== Academy of Country Music Awards ==
Year	Nominee / work	Award	Result	Ref.
2007	Brenda Lee	Cliffie Stone Pioneer Award	Won	

== Billboard Magazine awards ==
Year	Nominee / work	Award	Result	Ref.
1963	Brenda Lee	Top Female Vocalist	Won	
1964	Brenda Lee	Favorite Female Vocalist	Nominated	
1965	Brenda Lee	Favorite Female Vocalist (Pop)	Nominated	

== Cash Box Magazine awards ==
Year	Nominee / work	Award	Result	Ref.
1960	Brenda Lee	Best Pop Female Vocalist	Nominated	
1961	Brenda Lee	Best Female Vocalist – Singles	Nominated	
1961	Brenda Lee	Best Female Vocalist – LP's	Won	
1962	Brenda Lee	Best Female Vocalist – LP's	Nominated	
1962	Brenda Lee	Best Female Vocalist – Singles	Won	
1963	Brenda Lee	Best Female Vocalist – Singles	Won	
1964	Brenda Lee	Best Female Vocalist – Albums	Nominated	
1964	Brenda Lee	Best Female Vocalist – Singles	Nominated	
1966	Brenda Lee	Best Female Vocalist – Albums	Nominated	
1966	Brenda Lee	Best Female Vocalist – Singles	Nominated	

== Grammy Awards ==
Year	Nominee / work	Award	Result	Ref.
1961	"I'm Sorry"	Best Vocal Performance Single Record or Track, Female	Nominated	
1970	"Johnny One Time"	Best Contemporary-Pop Vocal Performance, Female	Nominated	
1980	"Tell Me What It's Like"	Best Country Vocal Performance, Female	Nominated	
1989	"Honky Tonk Angels Medley" (with k.d. lang, Loretta Lynn and Kitty Wells)	Best Country Vocal Performance, Duet	Nominated	
2009	Brenda Lee	Grammy Lifetime Achievement Award	Won	

== NARM Awards ==
Year	Nominee / work	Award	Result	Ref.
1960	Brenda Lee	Most Promising Female Vocalist	Won	
1962	Brenda Lee	Best Selling Female Vocalist	Won	

== Inductions ==
Year	Nominee / work	Award	Result	Ref.
1982	Brenda Lee	Georgia Music Hall of Fame	Inducted	
1986	Brenda Lee	Atlanta Music Hall of Fame	Inducted	
1997	Brenda Lee	Country Music Hall of Fame	Inducted	
2002	Brenda Lee	Rock and Roll Hall of Fame	Inducted	
2019	"Rockin' Around the Christmas Tree"	Grammy Hall of Fame	Inducted	
