= How Many Times =

How Many Times can refer to:

- "How Many Times" (DJ Khaled song), 2015
- "How Many Times" (Family Brown song), 1990
- "How Many Times", a song by K. Michelle (2011)
- "How Many Times", a song by Aretha Franklin from A Rose Is Still a Rose (1998)
- "How Many Times", a song by Peter Cetera from Peter Cetera
- "How Many Times", a song by Kate Ryan from Alive
- "How Many Times", a song by Tinashe from Aquarius (2014)
- "How Many Times", a song by Toto from Kingdom of Desire
- "How Many Times", a song in the animated television special Halloween Is Grinch Night
- "How Many Times", a song written by Mel Price, Bill Choate and Rody Erickson (1948)
- "How Many Times", by MC Cheung from Have A Good Time (2021)
- "How Many Times?", a song by Irving Berlin
- "How Many Times?", a song by Insane Clown Posse on the album The Great Milenko
