= Already Restless =

Studio album by Prescott-Brown
- Released: 1994
- Genre: Country
- Length: 40:31
- Label: Columbia Records
- Producers: Pat McMakin; Randall Prescott; Paul Worley

Prescott-Brown chronology
Tracey Prescott & Lonesome Daddy (1992)	Already Restless (1994)

Already Restless is the second and final studio album by Canadian country music trio Prescott-Brown. It was released by Columbia Records in 1994. The album peaked at number 10 on the RPM Country Albums chart in Canada.

== Track listing ==
No.	Title	Writer(s)	Length
1.	"Thirty Nine Days"	Barry Brown, Eric Emerson	3:40
2.	"Broken String of Pearls"	Brown, Dave McConnell, Randall Prescott	3:20
3.	"Heart of Gold"	Brown, McConnell, Prescott, John Park-Wheeler	3:36
4.	"Already Restless"	Grag Barnhill, Jim Daddario	3:48
5.	"If He's Ever Near"	Karla Bonoff	3:26
6.	"There Ain't Much You Can Do About Love"	Brown, Stewart Harris, Prescott	2:44
7.	"Talkin' Love"	Ed Hill, Mark D. Sanders	2:32
8.	"Happy Ever After"	Gary Nicholson, Kevin Welch	3:40
9.	"Nothing a Little Love Can't Take Care Of"	Brown, Harris, Prescott	3:40
10.	"The Heart of Love"	Rick Bowles, Tommy James, Harry Stinson	3:28
11.	"New Years Eve 1999"	Gretchen Peters	2:19
12.	"There You Go"	Brown, Prescott	3:24
13.	"All or Nothin'" (CD bonus track)	Brown, Harris, Prescott	3:34

== Personnel ==
- Tom Burroughs - electric guitar
- Joe Chemay - bass
- Jerry Douglas - resonator guitar
- Dan Dugmore - electric guitar, steel guitar, slide guitar
- John Dymond - bass
- Carl Gorodetzky - violin
- John Jorgenson - electric guitar
- Paul Leim - drums
- Bob Mason - cello
- Brent Mason - electric guitar
- The Nashville String Machine - strings
- Steve Nathan - keyboards
- Steve O'Connor - keyboards
- Jon Park-Wheeler - electric guitar, acoustic guitar
- Ken Post - drums
- Harry Stinson - drums, vocals
- Gary Vanosdale - viola
- Biff Watson - acoustic guitar
- Kris Wilkinson - viola
- Paul Worley - electric guitar, acoustic guitar
- Barry Brown - vocals, acoustic guitar
- Randall Prescott - vocals, mandolin, harp
- Tracey Prescott - vocals

== Chart performance ==
Chart (1994)	Peak position
Canadian RPM Country Albums	10
