= Only When I Laugh (song) =

Single by Brenda Lee

from the album Only When I Laugh
- B-side: "Too Many Nights Alone"
- Released: October 1981
- Genre: Country; adult contemporary
- Length: 2:28
- Label: MCA
- Songwriters: Richard Maltby Jr.; David Shire
- Producer: Ron Chancey

Brenda Lee singles chronology
"Enough for You" (1981)	"Only When I Laugh" (1981)	"From Levis to Calvin Klein Jeans" (1982)

"Only When I Laugh" is a song originally recorded by Brenda Lee and appeared on the 1981 Neil Simon movie which shared the same name. It was written by film composing team, Richard Maltby Jr. and David Shire. Released as a single by MCA Records, it placed in the top 40 on the US country songs chart in 1981. It also served as the title track to Lee's album of the same name.

== Background, recording and content ==
One of the best-selling 1960s pop music artists, Brenda Lee had a string of US and international hits during the decade before transitioning into country music during the 1970s, where she had continued hits on the country charts. Lee's country chart success ran from the mid-1970s through the mid-1980s. Among her early 1980s singles was "Only When I Laugh". The song was composed by Richard Maltby Jr. and David Shire, a songwriting team who wrote music for a series of films in the 1970s, 1980s and 1990s. "Only When I Laugh" was written for Neil Simon's 1981 movie which shared the same name. The song told the story of a woman who had mixed feelings surrounding the breakup from a romantic partner. The recording was produced by Ron Chancey and featured string instrumentation from Bergen White.

== Release and critical reception ==
"Only When I Laugh" was released by MCA Records in October 1981 as a seven-inch vinyl record and featured a B-side titled "Too Many Nights Alone" (which was taken from Lee's 1980 album Take Me Back). Despite the song being the title tune to the 1981 movie, Lee's version is not included in the actual film. Only the music is part of the actual film, with Lee's vocals cut out. The song received a positive reception from music critics at the time of its release. Billboard named it one of its "Top Single Picks" in October 1981, believing the song had crossover pop potential due to its string instrumentation. Cash Box magazine named it one of its "Feature Picks" in one of their October 1981 issues of the publication.

== Chart performance ==
"Only When I Laugh" made its debut on the US Billboard Hot Country Songs chart on October 24, 1981, and spent 13 weeks there. On December 12, the song peaked at the number 32 position. It was the sixteenth single in her career to place in the Billboard country songs top 40. The song appeared on Lee's 1981 studio album of the same name.

== Track listing ==
7" vinyl single

- "Only When I Laugh" – 2:28
- "Too Many Nights Alone" – 3:50

== Charts ==
Weekly chart performance for "Only When I Laugh"
Chart (1981)	Peak position
US Hot Country Songs (Billboard)	32
