= Only When I Laugh (Brenda Lee album) =

Studio album by Brenda Lee
- Released: November 1981
- Studios: Woodland Studios; Sound Emporium
- Genres: Country; MOR
- Label: MCA
- Producer: Ron Chancey

Brenda Lee chronology
Take Me Back (1980)	Only When I Laugh (1981)	The Winning Hand (1982)

Singles from Only When I Laugh
- 1. "Only When I Laugh" Released: October 1981; 2. "From Levis to Calvin Klein Jeans" Released: January 1982

Only When I Laugh is the thirtieth studio album by American singer, Brenda Lee. It was released in November 1981 by MCA Records. The album contained ten tracks, including the title song, which was the album's lead single and was featured in the 1981 film that shared its name with the project. It received a positive response from both Billboard and Cash Box magazines following its release.

== Background ==
Brenda Lee had been among the best-selling pop recording artists of the 1960s, accumulating number one songs like "I'm Sorry" and "I Want to Be Wanted". In the 1970s, she re-emerged as a country music artist and had top ten songs like "Nobody Wins" and "Sunday Sunrise". She then briefly recorded for Elektra Records before returning to her long-time label, MCA. After signing back with MCA, she had more top ten singles beginning with "Tell Me What It's Like", followed by more commercial success into the early 1980s. Among her singles from the early 1980s was "Only When I Laugh", which served as the title tune to Lee's next studio album.

== Recording and content ==
The project was produced by Ron Chancey, whom had produced Lee since she returned to MCA. The ten-track album contained "A Good Love Don't Come Easy", a song penned by a winner of the US Kentucky Fried Chicken National Country Music Songwriting Contest (Bill Price). The title track was recorded for the 1981 movie of the same name. "From Levis to Calvin Klein Jeans" was about a cowboy who suddenly became wealthy but wished for a simpler existence rather than his current state. Another track, "Shine On", would later be recorded and made a top ten country song by George Jones. In her book, Lee regretted not having her version become a single: "It was one of the few times I'd 'missed' as a song expert."

== Release, critical reception and singles ==
Only When I Laugh was released by MCA Records in November 1981 and was her thirtieth studio album in her career. It was offered as either a vinyl LP or a cassette. The album received positive reviews after its release. Billboard wrote, "This album is a well-crafted package that admirably showcases Lee's rich, bluesy vocals." Cash Box wrote, "Lee's charming vocal quality packed into that tiny human frame is every bit as potent today as it was 25 years ago when she first captured the heart of America." Two singles stemmed from the project, beginning with the title track (first issued by MCA in October 1981). It reached the top 40 of the US Hot Country Songs chart, peaking at number 32 in late 1981. Its second single was released in January 1982: "From Levis to Calvin Klein Jeans". The song rose to a similar position on the US country chart, peaking at number 33 in early 1982. It reached the same position on Canada's Country Tracks chart.

== Track listing ==
Side one
No.	Title	Writer(s)	Length
1.	"Only When I Laugh" (from the Columbia Motion Picture Only When I Laugh)	Richard Maltby Jr.; David Shire	2:58
2.	"Love Letters"	Edward Heyman; Victor Young	3:23
3.	"A Good Love Don't Come That Easy"	Bill Price	2:41
4.	"What a Way to Say Goodbye"	Steve Gibb	3:37
5.	"I Know a Lot About Love"	Bruce Channel; Hal Bynum	2:34

Side two
No.	Title	Writer(s)	Length
1.	"From Levis to Calvin Klein Jeans"	Richard D. Runyeon; Rick Lathrop	3:47
2.	"Out of Her Arms"	Deborah Allen; Rafe Van Hoy	2:58
3.	"There's More to Me Than What You Can See"	Troy Seals; Roger Chapman	2:16
4.	"Love Ain't the Question (Love Ain't the Answer)"	Hazel Smith	3:33
5.	"Shine On"	Johnny MacRae; Bob Morrison	3:41

== Personnel ==
All credits are adapted from the liner notes of Only When I Laugh.

Musical personnel

- Lea Jane Berinati – Background vocals
- Hayward Bishop – Drums
- David Briggs – Keyboards
- Kenneth Buttrey – Drums
- Vicki Hampton – Background vocals
- Yvonne Hodges – Background vocals
- Sheldon Kurland – Strings
- Donna McElroy – Background vocals
- Terry McMillan – Harmonica
- Farrell Morris – Percussion
- Weldon Myrick – Steel guitar
- Ron Oates – Keyboards
- Joe Osborn – Bass
- Larry Paxton – Bass
- Hargus Robbins – Keyboards
- Harold Rugg – Steel guitar
- Dennis Solee – Saxophone
- Diane Tidwell – Background vocals
- John Williams – Bass

Technical personnel

- Ron Chancey – Producer
- Ken Corlew – Assistant engineer
- D. Hogan Design – Design
- George Drucker – Special thanks
- Steve Ham – Assistant engineer
- Kerry Kopp – Assistant engineer
- Les Ladd – Recording and mixing
- Kerry McCollister – Assistant engineer
- David McKinley – Assistant engineer
- George Osaki – Art direction
- Denny Purcell – Mastering
- Bergen White – String arrangements
- Dick Zimmerman – Photos

== Release history ==
Release history and formats for Only When I Laugh
Region	Date	Format	Label	Ref.
Various	November 1981	Vinyl LP; cassette	MCA Records	
