= Tracey Brown =

Canadian musician

- Origin: Ottawa, Ontario, Canada
- Genres: Country
- Occupation: Singer-songwriter
- Instrument: Vocals
- Years active: 1967–present
- Labels: Popular/EMI
- Formerly of: Family Brown; Prescott-Brown

Tracey Brown is a Canadian country music artist. Brown, a former member of Family Brown, was nominated for a 1999 Juno Award for Best Country Female Vocalist. Her first solo studio album, Woman's Work, was released in 1998 and produced a Top 20 single with the title track.

== Biography ==
Brown began performing at 10 years old as a member of Canada's most awarded country band, Family Brown. During the group's 22-year career, they recorded 17 albums and hosted a syndicated television show. Brown went on to form Juno Award winning group Prescott-Brown with her brother Barry and husband Randall Prescott.

Tracey Brown released her first solo CD in 1998. Three singles were released from the album, including the title track, which peaked at No. 12 on the RPM Canadian country singles chart. Brown was nominated for Best Country Female Vocalist at the 1999 Juno Awards and Independent Female Vocalist of the Year at the 1999 Canadian Country Music Association Awards.

In 2000, Brown was featured in the photo book Dare to Dream – A Celebration of Canadian Women. The following year, she performed at the YWCA Women of Distinction Awards and co-wrote and performed a song for the award-winning short film, Charlie Noir.

Brown completed work on her second solo studio album, Alone, which was released in 2008. Its first single, "If You Wanna Keep My Love," written by Jon Park-Wheeler, Tracey Brown, and Randall Prescott was sent to country radio in September.

In 2014, Brown toured on the Canadian Pacific Railway Holiday Trains in the United States and Canada.

== Discography ==
=== Albums ===
Title	Details
Woman's Work	Release date: 1998; Label: Popular/EMI
Alone	Release date: 2008; Label: Rip Roar Music

=== Singles ===
Year	Single	Peak positions	Album
Year	Single	CAN Country	Album
1998	"Woman's Work"	12	Woman's Work
1998	"Going Going Gone"	41	Woman's Work
1999	"Returning the Faith"	—	Woman's Work
2008	"If You Wanna Keep My Love"	—	Alone
2009	"Alone"	—	Alone
"—" denotes releases that did not chart

=== Guest singles ===
Year	Single	Artist	Peak positions	Album
Year	Single	Artist	CAN Country	Album
1990	"Start of Something New"	Terry Carisse	6	That Was a Long Time Ago

=== Music videos ===
Year	Video
1998	"Woman's Work"
1998	"Going Going Gone"
1999	"Returning the Faith"
