= From Levis to Calvin Klein Jeans =

Single by Brenda Lee

from the album Only When I Laugh
- B-side: "I Know a Lot About Love"
- Released: January 1982
- Genre: Country
- Length: 3:47
- Label: MCA
- Songwriters: Bucky Jones; Richard Runyson; Rick Lathrop
- Producer: Ron Chancey

Brenda Lee singles chronology
"Only When I Laugh" (1981)	"From Levis to Calvin Klein Jeans" (1982)	"Keeping Me Warm for You" (1982)

"From Levis to Calvin Klein Jeans" is a song originally recorded by Brenda Lee. It told the story of a cowboy who craves a simpler lifestyle after becoming wealthy. It was released as a single by MCA Records in January 1982 and became a top 40 song on the North American country charts.

== Background, recording and content ==
Brenda Lee transitioned from being one of the top-selling pop music artists of the 1960s to a top-selling country music artist in the 1970s and 1980s. She had continued chart success in the country genre into the 1980s and had top 40 songs like "From Levis to Calvin Klein Jeans" Co-written by Bucky Jones, Richard Runyson and Rick Lathrop, the song told a "rags-to-riches" story of a cowboy who despite his fancier lifestyle craves a simpler existence. The track was produced by Ron Chancey and included string arrangements from Bergen White.

== Release, critical reception and chart performance ==
"From Levis to Calvin Klein Jeans" was released as a single in January 1982 by MCA Records and was distributed as a seven-inch vinyl record, featuring a B-side titled "I Know a Lot About Love". The song first appeared as a track on Lee's 1981 studio album, Only When I Laugh. In January 1982, Cash Box named it one of its "Feature Picks". The single debuted on the US Billboard Hot Country Songs chart on January 30, 1982 and spent 11 weeks on the chart, rising to the number 33 position on March 13. It was Lee's seventeenth top 40 placement on the Billboard country chart. It reached an identical position on Canada's RPM Country Tracks chart in 1982.

== Track listing ==
7" vinyl single

- "From Levis to Calvin Klein Jeans" – 3:47
- "I Know a Lot About Love" – 2:34

== Charts ==
Weekly chart performance for "From Levis to Calvin Klein Jeans"
Chart (1982)	Peak position
Canada Country Tracks (RPM)	33
US Hot Country Songs (Billboard)	33
