= Even Better =

Studio album by Brenda Lee
- Released: January 1980
- Recorded: October 1979
- Studios: Woodland Sound Studios; Sound Stage Studios
- Genre: Country
- Label: MCA
- Producer: Ron Chancey

Brenda Lee chronology
Just for You Something Nice (1977)	Even Better (1980)	Take Me Back (1980)

Singles from Even Better
- 1. "Tell Me What It's Like" Released: October 1979; 2. "The Cowgirl and the Dandy" Released: February 1980; 3. "Keeping Me Warm for You" Released: June 1982

Even Better is the twenty-eighth studio album by American singer, Brenda Lee. It was released by MCA Records in January 1980. Consisting of ten tracks, it was considered her "comeback" album in the country genre, featuring Lee in a new hairstyle on the cover and new compositions written by songwriters like Rafe Van Hoy. Even Better received mostly critical praise for showcasing Lee's characteristic vocal stylings. The album featured three singles, two of which became her first country top ten singles in several years: "Tell Me What It's Like" and "The Cowgirl and the Dandy".

== Background ==
Brenda Lee was among music's best-selling artists during the 1960s after having a series of top ten and number one pop singles. She transitioned into the country genre during the 1970s and had several US top ten country songs during the middle decade. Most of her records up to this point were produced by Owen Bradley, but he retired from the music industry in the late 1970s. Lee then recorded pop and disco with other producers and briefly signed a contract with Elektra Records but ultimately returned to her former label (MCA) in 1979. Lee then began making her next album project in 1979.

== Recording and content ==
Signed to MCA in 1979 by Jim Foglesong, Lee advocated to assist her in finding a producer that would match the chemistry she had with Bradley. Foglesong connected her with Ron Chancey and the pair "hit it right off", according to Lee's autobiography. Chancey began recording sessions with her in October 1979 at two Nashville, Tennessee studios: the Woodland Sound Studio and Sound Stage Studios. Lee recalled in her book that the album was the first in her career where she overdubbed her vocals, which was considered a new technology in 1979. Prior to that, she had cut most of her material in a live format. Even Better consisted of ten tracks, including three written by Rafe Van Hoy: "You Only Broke My Heart", "At the Moonlite" and "I Wish That I Could Hurt That Way Again". Another track, "Goodbye Love", was co-written by Van Hoy's wife, Deborah Allen. Another track titled "The Cowgirl and the Dandy" was written by Bobby Goldsboro and had previously been recorded by Dolly Parton.

== Critical reception ==
Professional ratings
Review scores
Source	Rating
AllMusic	2.5/5 stars

Even Better received mostly positive reviews from critics, music publications and writers following its release. Billboard placed it among its "Top Album Picks" in January 1980, highlighting the album's use of new string instrumentation and found that Lee's voice remains just "as powerful" as it previously did. Cashbox had a similar review, writing that she performed the tracks "forcefully". Jerry Sharpe of The Pittsburgh Press described Lee's voice as "bluesy", but also wrote, "As on most albums, not every song is a chart-topper, but all are good listenin'." Jennifer Williamson of the Spokane Daily Chronicle wrote that she could not "praise this album enough", complimenting her "torchy" and "throaty voice", positively praising it to her 1960s pop recordings. Greg Adams of AllMusic only rated the project 2.5 out of five possible stars, theorizing that fans of her "oldies" pop music will be turned away from the album's "slick" and "modern" country style.

== Release, promotion and singles ==
Even Better was released by MCA Records in January 1980 and was Lee's twenty eighth studio album. It was offered in two formats: a vinyl LP or a cassette. In her autobiography, Lee recalled that MCA made "big plans" for the album by giving her a new hairstyle (as showcased on the album cover) and advertised it in several trade publications. In magazines such as Cashbox, it was advertised as Lee's "comeback" album. Three singles were included on Even Better, with its earliest being "Tell Me What It's Like" (issued by MCA in October 1979). It reached the top ten on the US Hot Country Songs chart, peaking at number eight and becoming her first top ten recording in nearly five years. It also made the top 20 of Canada's Country Tracks chart, rising to number 18. The second single from Even Better was Lee's version of "The Cowgirl and the Dandy". Released by MCA in February 1980, it rose into the top ten of both the US and Canadian country charts, peaking at number ten in the US and number eight in Canada. "Keeping Me Warm for You" was released as the final single in June 1982 and reached number 70 on the US country chart.

== Track listing ==
Side one
No.	Title	Writer(s)	Length
1.	"Keeping Me Warm for You"	Kermit Goell; John Christopher	3:56
2.	"Love Ain't Seen the Last of Me"	Eddie Setser; Troy Seals	3:05
3.	"You Only Broke My Heart"	Don Cook; Rafe Van Hoy	3:26
4.	"At the Moonlite"	Don Cook; Rafe Van Hoy	2:41
5.	"Goodbye Love"	Deborah Allen; Jim Stafford	2:57

Side two
No.	Title	Writer(s)	Length
1.	"I Wish That I Could Hurt That Way Again"	Rafe Van Hoy; Don Cook; Curly Putman	3:06
2.	"Tell Me What It's Like"	Ben Peters	2:57
3.	"Memories for Sale"	Linda Hargrove; Mary Ann Kennedy; Pam Rose	3:43
4.	"Do You Wanna Spend the Night"	Eddy Raven	2:43
5.	"The Cowgirl and the Dandy"	Bobby Goldsboro	4:20

== Personnel ==
All credits are adapted from the liner notes of Even Better.

Musical personnel

- Lea Jane Berinati – Voices
- George Binkley III – Strings
- Kenneth Buttrey – Drums
- James Capps – Rhythm guitar
- John Catchings – Strings
- Marvin Chantry – Strings
- Roy Christensen – Strings
- Mary Fielder – Voices
- Solie Fott – Strings
- Janie Fricke – Voices
- Carl Gorodetzky – Strings
- Vicki Hampton – Voices
- Yvonne Hodges – Voices
- Sheldon Kurland – Strings
- Brenda Lee – Lead vocals
- Wildred Lehmann – Strings
- Donna McElroy – Voices
- Terry McMillan – Harmonica
- Dennis Molchan – Strings
- Weldon Myrick – Steel guitar
- Ron Oates – Piano
- Jerry Shook – Rhythm guitar
- John Smarr – Lead guitar
- Norman Keith (Buddy) Spicher – Fiddle
- Sam Terranova – Strings
- Rafe Van Hoy – Lead guitar
- Gary Vanosdale – Strings
- Jack Williams – Bass
- Stephanie Woolf – Strings
- Chip Young – Rhythm guitar
- Reggie Young – Lead guitar

Technical personnel

- Ron Chancey – Producer
- Steve Goostree – Recording engineer
- Les Ladd – Mixing engineer, recording engineer
- David McKinley – Recording engineer
- Danny Purcell – Mastering engineer
- Steve Psanos – Recording engineer
- Ronnie Shacklett – Special thanks
- Skip Shimmin – Recording engineer
- Justine Troll – Special thanks
- Bergen White – String arrangements

== Release history ==
Release history and formats for Even Better
Region	Date	Format	Label	Ref.
Various	January 1980	Vinyl LP; cassette	MCA Records	
Various	January 1980	Vinyl LP; cassette	MCA Records; Ariola Records	
Various	Circa 2026	Music download; streaming	MCA Nashville	
