= Repeat After Me (song) =

Single by Family Brown

from the album Repeat After Me
- B-side: "Everyday People"
- Released: February 1984
- Genre: Country
- Length: 2:59
- Label: RCA
- Songwriter(s): Barry Brown
- Producer(s): Tony Brown; Norro Wilson

Family Brown singles chronology
| "We Really Got a Hold on Love" (1983) | "Repeat After Me" (1984) | "Did You Know" (1984) |

"Repeat After Me" is a song by Canadian country music group Family Brown. The song was released as a single in February 1984 and is the second single from their ninth studio album Repeat After Me. The single peaked at number five on the Canadian RPM Country Tracks chart in May 1984.

"Repeat After Me" received two nominations at the 1984 Canadian Country Music Association Awards for Single of the Year and Song of the Year. The song lost to Anne Murray's "A Little Good News" and Dick Damron's "Jesus, It's Me Again", respectively.

== Chart performance ==
| Chart (1984) | Peak position |
|---|---|
| Canadian RPM Adult Contemporary | 20 |
| Canadian RPM Country Tracks | 5 |
| U.S. Billboard Hot Country Singles | 56 |
