= How Many Times (Family Brown song) =

Single by Family Brown

from the album Life and Times 1982-1989
- B-side: "I Love You More"
- Released: 1990
- Genre: Country
- Length: 2:54
- Label: RCA
- Songwriter: Barry Brown
- Producer: Randall Prescott

Family Brown singles chronology
"Pioneers" (1989)	"How Many Times" (1990)

"How Many Times" is a song recorded by Canadian country music group Family Brown. It was released in 1990 as the second single from their album Life and Times 1982-1989. It peaked at number 3 on the RPM Country Tracks chart in April 1990.

== Chart performance ==
Chart (1990)	Peak position
Canada Country Singles (RPM)	3

=== Year-end charts ===
Chart (1990)	Position
Canada Country Tracks (RPM)	59
