= Tracey Prescott & Lonesome Daddy (album) =

Studio album by Tracey Prescott & Lonesome Daddy
- Released: 1992
- Genre: Country
- Label: Columbia Records
- Producer: Randall Prescott

Tracey Prescott & Lonesome Daddy chronology
Tracey Prescott & Lonesome Daddy (1992)	Already Restless (1994)

Tracey Prescott & Lonesome Daddy is the debut studio album by Canadian country music trio Tracey Prescott & Lonesome Daddy. It was released by Columbia Records in 1992. It includes the top 10 single "When You're Not Loving Me".

== Track listing ==
No.	Title	Length
1.	"Something Big"	2:58
2.	"Lonesome Town"	2:36
3.	"When You're Not Loving Me"	3:39
4.	"Out on the Run"	3:19
5.	"If You Only Knew"	3:07
6.	"Lonesome Daddy"	3:16
7.	"Down on the Farm"	3:00
8.	"Take a Little Time"	2:24
9.	"Whoa Boy"	2:44
10.	"Don't You Ever Leave Me"	2:12
11.	"Nobody's Home on the Range"	3:27
