= There You Go (Prescott-Brown song) =

Single by Prescott-Brown

from the album Already Restless
- Released: 1994
- Genre: Country
- Length: 3:24
- Label: Columbia
- Songwriters: Barry Brown; Randall Prescott
- Producers: Pat McMakin; Randall Prescott; Paul Worley

Prescott-Brown singles chronology
"Don't You Ever Leave Me" (1993)	"There You Go" (1994)	"There Ain't Much You Can Do About Love" (1994)

"There You Go" is a song recorded by Canadian country music group Prescott-Brown. It was released in 1994 as the first single from their second studio album, Already Restless. It peaked at number 10 on the RPM Country Tracks chart in July 1994.

== Chart performance ==
Chart (1994)	Peak position
Canada Country Singles (RPM)	10
