= Broken Trust =

Single by Brenda Lee

from the album Take Me Back
- B-side: "Right Behind the Rain"
- Released: 5 September 1980
- Recorded: 19 May 1980
- Studio: Woodland (Nashville, Tennessee)
- Genre: Country
- Length: 3:43
- Label: MCA Records 41322
- Songwriter(s): Jimbeau Hinson
- Producer(s): Ron Chancey

Brenda Lee singles chronology
"Don't Promise Me Anything (Do It)" (1980)	"Broken Trust" (1980)	"Every Now and Then" (1981)

"Broken Trust" is a song written by Jimbeau Hinson and was produced by Ron Chancey, and performed by Brenda Lee and The Oak Ridge Boys. The song reached #9 on the U.S. country chart and #14 on the Canadian country chart in 1980. It was featured on her 1980 album, Take Me Back.
