= Prescott-Brown =

Canadian musical trio

- Also known as: Tracey Prescott & Lonesome Daddy
- Origin: Ontario, Canada
- Genres: Country
- Years active: 1991–1996
- Label: Columbia Records
- Spinoff of: Family Brown
- Past members: Barry Brown; Tracey Brown; Randall Prescott

Prescott-Brown was a Canadian country music trio composed of Tracey Brown, her brother Barry, and her husband Randall Prescott. All three were members of the Canadian country group, Family Brown, which parted ways in 1990. Signed to Columbia Records, the trio released two albums for the label in 1992 and 1994. The trio made appearances on shows such as The Tommy Hunter Show, The Dini Petty Show, Rita and Friends, Open Mike with Mike Bullard, and Adrienne Clarkson Presents.

== Biography ==
Tracey Brown, Barry Brown, and Randall Prescott originally came together in 1991 as Tracey Prescott & Lonesome Daddy. The trio's eponymous debut album was released by Sony Music Canada in 1992. Five singles were released from the project, including the Top 10 song "When You're Not Loving Me." The following year, Tracey Prescott & Lonesome Daddy won a Juno Award for Best Country Group or Duo.

They changed their name to Prescott-Brown for the release of their second studio album, 1994's Already Restless. The album's first single, "There You Go," brought them back into the Top 10 of the Canadian country singles chart. Prescott-Brown was nominated for Best Country Group or Duo at the 1995 Juno Awards.

Since disbanding in 1996, Tracey has launched a successful solo career.

Tracey Brown and Randall Prescott have two grown children, Kelly Prescott and Kaylen Prescott. Following in their parents' footsteps, they are currently working on producing a full-length album under the band name "Prescott". They have performed at various venues local to their rural hometown rural Ottawa. They have also performed at Ottawa's Bluesfest. Their style is reminiscent of the country influences of their parents, but have incorporated elements of rock, blues, and various instruments into their music.

== Discography ==
=== Albums ===
Title	Album details	Peak positions
Title	Album details	CAN Country
Tracey Prescott & Lonesome Daddy	Release date: 1992; Label: Columbia Records	—
Already Restless	Release date: 1994; Label: Columbia Records	10
"—" denotes releases that did not chart

=== Singles ===
Year	Title	Peak positions	Album
Year	Title	CAN Country	Album
1992	"When You're Not Loving Me"	8	Tracey Prescott & Lonesome Daddy
1992	"Something Big"	31	Tracey Prescott & Lonesome Daddy
1993	"If Only You Knew"	17	Tracey Prescott & Lonesome Daddy
1993	"Lonesome Town"	63	Tracey Prescott & Lonesome Daddy
1993	"Don't You Ever Leave Me"	—	Tracey Prescott & Lonesome Daddy
1994	"There You Go"	10	Already Restless
1994	"There Ain't Much You Can Do About Love"	35	Already Restless
1995	"Broken String of Pearls"	15	Already Restless
1995	"Thirty Nine Days"	29	Already Restless
1995	"Talkin' Love"	52	Already Restless
1996	"Nothing That a Little Love Can't Take Care Of"	—	Already Restless
"—" denotes releases that did not chart

=== Music videos ===
Year	Video	Director
1994	"There Ain't Much You Can Do About Love"	
1995	"Thirty Nine Days"	
1995	"Talkin' Love"	
1996	"Nothing That a Little Love Can't Take Care Of"	Jean-Claude Caprara
1996	"Christmas Call"	Jean-Claude Caprara
1998	"Mrs. Claus"	
