= Every Now and Then (Brenda Lee song) =

Single by Brenda Lee

from the album Take Me Back
- B-side: "He'll Play The Music (But You Can't Make Him Dance)"
- Released: January 1981
- Genre: Country
- Length: 3:12
- Label: MCA
- Songwriter(s): Shayne Dolan; Rock Killough
- Producer(s): Ron Chancey

Brenda Lee singles chronology
"Broken Trust" (1980)	"Every Now and Then" (1981)	"Fool, Fool" (1981)

"Every Now and Then" is a song originally recorded by American singer, Brenda Lee. It was released as a single by MCA Records in 1981 and reached the US country top 40 that year. It was also included on her 1980 studio album titled Take Me Back.

== Background and recording ==
Among pop's best-selling 1960s recording artists, Brenda Lee transitioned into the country field during the 1970s and had a series of top ten singles on the country charts. Her singles continued to make the country charts into the 1980s, including with "Every Now and Then". Written by Shayne Dolan and Rock Killough, the song was produced by Ron Chancey.

== Release, reception and chart performance ==
"Every Now and Then" was taken from Lee's 1980 studio album, Take Me Back, and was issued as a single by MCA Records in January 1981. It featured a B-side titled "He'll Play The Music (But You Can't Make Him Dance)" and was issued on a seven-inch vinyl record. In their January 24, 1981 issue, Cashbox magazine featured "Every Now and Then" in their country section titled, "Hits Out of the Box". The single debuted on the US Billboard Hot Country Songs chart on January 31, 1981. The publication reported on February 7, 1981 that the single climbed 19 spots to the number 57 position. In March 1981, it reached the number 26 position and spent ten weeks on the chart. It also rose to the number 43 position on Canada's RPM Country Tracks chart in 1981.

== Track listing ==
7" vinyl single

- "Every Now and Then" – 3:12
- "He'll Play The Music (But You Can't Make Him Dance)" – 3:12

== Charts ==
Weekly chart performance for "Every Now and Then"
Chart (1981)	Peak position
Canada Country Tracks (RPM)	43
US Hot Country Songs (Billboard)	26
