= Repeat After Me =

Studio album by Family Brown
- Released: 1984
- Studios: Music City Music Hall (Nashville, Tennessee)
- Genre: Country
- Label: RCA Records
- Producers: Tony Brown; Jack Feeney; Norro Wilson

Family Brown chronology
Raised on Country Music (1982)	Repeat After Me (1984)	Feel the Fire (1985)

Repeat After Me is the ninth studio album by Canadian country music group Family Brown. It was released in 1984 by RCA Records and includes the singles, "We Really Got a Hold on Love", "Repeat After Me", "Do You Know", and "Straight Forward Love Affair", which all charted on the RPM Country Tracks chart in Canada. The album won the award for Album of the Year at the 1984 Canadian Country Music Association Awards.

== Track listing ==
No.	Title	Writer(s)	Length
1.	"Repeat After Me"	Barry Brown	2:59
2.	"Does There Have to Be a Reason"	B. Brown	2:49
3.	"Did You Know"	B. Brown	2:53
4.	"As Close to Cheatin' (As Cheatin' Can Be)"	Kim Vassy, Justin Wilde	3:35
5.	"Faded Rose"	Scott Miller	2:48
6.	"We Really Got a Hold on Love"	Michael Foster, Tony Brown	3:22
7.	"These Are the Good Old Days"		2:04
8.	"Mister and Misbehavin'"		2:27
9.	"Everyday People"		2:53
10.	"Straight Forward Love Affair"	B. Brown	2:49
