= Til I Find My Love =

Single by Family Brown

from the album These Days
- B-side: "Just a Little Bit of Love"
- Released: May 9, 1988
- Genre: Country
- Length: 3:44
- Label: RCA
- Songwriter(s): Barry Brown
- Producer(s): Randall Prescott

Family Brown singles chronology
"Overnight Success" (1987)	"Til I Find My Love" (1988)	"Town of Tears" (1988)

"Til I Find My Love" is a single by Canadian country music group Family Brown. Released in May 1988, the song is the first single from their tenth studio album These Days. The song reached number one on the RPM Country Tracks chart in July 1988 and also crossed over to the Adult Contemporary Tracks chart, peaking at number 19.

== Chart performance ==
Chart (1988)	Peak position
Canadian RPM Country Tracks	1
Canadian RPM Adult Contemporary Tracks	19

=== Year-end charts ===
Chart (1988)	Position
Canadian RPM Country Tracks	7
