= But It's Cheating =

Single by Family Brown

from the album Nothing Really Changes
- B-side: "No One's Gonna Love Me (Like You Do)"
- Released: 1980
- Genre: Country
- Length: 3:20
- Label: RCA
- Songwriter(s): Barry Brown
- Producer(s): Jack Feeney

Family Brown singles chronology
"Love Was on Our Side" (1979)	"But It's Cheating" (1980)	"It's Really Love This Time" (1980)

"But It's Cheating" is a single by Canadian country music group Family Brown. Released in 1980, it was the first single from their seventh studio album Nothing Really Changes. The song reached number one on the RPM Country Tracks chart in Canada in September 1980. The song was re-released in early 1982, peaking at number 30 on the Billboard Hot Country Singles chart in the United States.

== Charts ==
Chart (1980)	Peak position
Canadian RPM Country Tracks	1
Chart (1982)	Peak position
Canadian RPM Country Tracks	43
U.S. Billboard Hot Country Singles	30
