= Stay with Me (Exile song) =

Single by Dave & Sugar

from the album Stay with Me / Golden Tears
- B-side: "What I Feel Is You"
- Released: June 1979
- Recorded: 1978
- Genre: Country
- Length: 2:38
- Label: RCA
- Songwriter(s): J.P. Pennington
- Producer(s): Jerry Bradley; Dave Rowland

Dave & Sugar singles chronology
"Golden Tears" (1979)	"Stay with Me" (1979)	"My World Begins and Ends with You" (1979)

"Stay with Me"

Single by Family Brown

from the album Familiar Faces, Familiar Places
- B-side: "Tag Along Joe"
- Released: June 1979
- Genre: Country
- Length: 2:38
- Label: RCA
- Songwriter(s): J.P. Pennington
- Producer(s): Jack Feeney

Family Brown singles chronology
"The Way I Love You" (1979)	"Stay with Me" (1979)	"Love Was on Our Side" (1979)

"Stay with Me" is a country music song written by J.P. Pennington and originally recorded by country pop band Exile in 1978. In 1979, the song was released as a single by the different artists. The first version, recorded by Dandy, reached number 57 of the Billboard Hot Country Singles chart. The song was most notably recorded by Dave and Sugar and Family Brown, who both reached the top ten of the country charts in the U.S. and Canada, respectively.

While not originally released as a single when recorded, Exile's version was later released in 1985.

== Chart performance ==
=== Dandy ===
Chart (1979)	Peak position
U.S. Billboard Hot Country Singles	57

=== Dave & Sugar ===
Chart (1979)	Peak position
U.S. Billboard Hot Country Singles	6

=== Family Brown ===
Chart (1979)	Peak position
Canada RPM Adult Contemporary	20
Canada RPM Country Tracks	4

=== Exile ===
Chart (1985)	Peak position
U.S. Billboard Hot Country Singles	86
