= The Cowgirl and the Dandy =

- French release picture sleeve

Single by Brenda Lee

from the album Even Better
- B-side: "Do You Wanna Spend the Night"
- Released: February 1980
- Genre: Country
- Length: 3:33
- Label: MCA Records
- Songwriter: Bobby Goldsboro
- Producer: Ron Chancey

Brenda Lee singles chronology
"Tell Me What It's Like" (1979)	"The Cowgirl and the Dandy" (1980)	"Don't Promise Me Anything (Do It)" (1980)

"The Cowgirl and the Dandy" is a song written by Bobby Goldsboro and most notably performed by Brenda Lee. The song reached No. 10 on the U.S. country chart and No. 8 on the Canadian country chart in 1980. It was featured on her 1980 album, Even Better.

The song was produced by Ron Chancey and arranged by Bergen White.

== Other versions ==
- Goldsboro originally released the song in 1977 entitled "The Cowboy and the Lady". It reached No. 85 on the U.S. country chart.
- John Denver released a gender-reversed version of the song in 1981 entitled "The Cowboy and the Lady" that reached #50 on the U.S. country chart and #66 on the Billboard Hot 100. It was featured on his 1981 album, Some Days Are Diamonds.
- Dolly Parton included the song on her 1977 Here You Come Again album.
