= Love Was on Our Side =

Single by Family Brown

from the album Familiar Faces, Familiar Places
- B-side: "Dear Hearts and Gentle People"
- Released: November 1979
- Recorded: 1979
- Studio: RCA Victor Studio, Toronto, Ontario
- Genre: Country
- Label: RCA
- Composer(s): Barry Brown
- Producer(s): Jack Feeney

Family Brown singles chronology
"Stay with Me" (1979)	"Love Was on Our Side" (1979)	"But It's Cheating" (1980)

"Love Was on Our Side" is a single by Canadian country music group Family Brown. Released in 1979, it was a single from their album Familiar Faces, Familiar Places. The song reached number one on the RPM Country Tracks chart in Canada in March 1980.

== Chart performance ==
Chart (1980)	Peak position
Canadian RPM Country Tracks	1
