= Still Falling in Love =

Single by Carroll Baker

from the album All for the Love of a Song
- Released: 1980
- Genre: Country
- Label: RCA
- Songwriter(s): James Kenneth Campbell Ross

Carroll Baker singles chronology
"Hollywood Love" (1980)	"Still Falling in Love" (1980)	"Breaking and Entering" (1981)

"Still Falling in Love" is a single by Canadian country music artist Carroll Baker. Released in 1980, it was the first single from her album All for the Love of a Song. The song reached number one on the RPM Country Tracks chart in Canada in December 1980.

== Charts ==
Chart (1980)	Peak position
Canadian RPM Country Tracks	1
Canadian RPM Adult Contemporary Tracks	11
