= Tell Me What It's Like =

Single by Brenda Lee

from the album Even Better
- B-side: "Let Your Love Fall Back on Me"
- Released: 5 October 1979
- Recorded: 24 July 1979
- Studio: Woodland (Nashville, Tennessee)
- Genre: Country
- Length: 2:57
- Label: MCA Records 41130
- Songwriter: Ben Peters
- Producer: Ron Chancey

Brenda Lee singles chronology
"Could It Be Love I Found Tonight" (1978)	"Tell Me What It's Like" (1979)	"The Cowgirl and the Dandy" (1980)

"Tell Me What It's Like" is a song written by Ben Peters and performed by Brenda Lee. The song reached #8 on the U.S. country chart and #18 on the Canadian country chart in 1979. It was featured on her 1980 album, Even Better. The song was nominated for the Grammy Award for Best Female Country Vocal Performance.

The song was produced by Ron Chancey and arranged by Bergen White.
