= Sparkle in Her Eyes =

Single by Terry Carisse

from the album Story of the Year
- Released: 1979
- Genre: Country
- Label: MBS
- Songwriter(s): Terry Carisse, Bruce Rawlins

Terry Carisse singles chronology
"Time to Go" (1979)	"Sparkle in Her Eyes" (1979)	"All Her Letters" (1980)

"Sparkle in Her Eyes" is a single by Canadian country music artist Terry Carisse. Released in 1979, it was the first single from his album Story of the Year. The song reached number one on the RPM Country Tracks chart in Canada in February 1980.

== Chart performance ==
Chart (1980)	Peak position
Canadian RPM Country Tracks	1
