= Hollywood Love =

Single by Carroll Baker

from the album Hollywood Love
- Released: 1980
- Genre: Country
- Label: RCA
- Songwriter(s): James Ross

Carroll Baker singles chronology
"My Turn" (1979)	"Hollywood Love" (1980)	"Still Falling in Love" (1980)

"Hollywood Love" is a single by Canadian country music artist Carroll Baker. Released in 1980, it was the second single from her 1979 album Hollywood Love. The song reached number one on the RPM Country Tracks chart in Canada in August 1980.

== Chart performance ==
Chart (1980)	Peak position
Canadian RPM Country Tracks	1
Canadian RPM Adult Contemporary Tracks	14
