= Take Me Back (Brenda Lee album) =

Studio album by Brenda Lee
- Released: October 1980
- Recorded: July 1980
- Studios: Woodland Sound Studios; Sound Stage Studios; Creative Workshop
- Genre: Country
- Label: MCA
- Producer: Ron Chancey

Brenda Lee chronology
Even Better (1980)	Take Me Back (1980)	Only When I Laugh (1981)

Singles from Take Me Back
- 1. "Broken Trust" Released: September 1980; 2. "Every Now and Then" Released: January 1981

Take Me Back is the twenty-ninth studio album by American singer, Brenda Lee. It was released in October 1980 and was her twenty ninth studio album. The ten-track disc featured production by Ron Chancey and featured songs written by Elton John and Kim Carnes. Of its two singles, "Broken Trust" (featuring The Oak Ridge Boys) reached the top ten of the US country chart. Take Me Back received positive reviews from writers and music publications.

== Background ==
During the 1960s, Brenda Lee was one of the best-selling pop music artists, with a string of top ten and number one singles. Her commercial success waned in the early 1970s until Lee re-emerged as a country music artist, having several US top ten songs on the country charts. Most of her recordings up to this point were produced by Owen Bradley, until he retired in the late 1970s. Lee was then paired with Ron Chancey, who helped reinvent her sound to match the late 1970s country pop recordings of the time. The first Chancey-produced album, Even Better, spawned two US top ten country hits and MCA pressured Lee to re-enter the studio to make her next Chancey-produced project.

== Recording and content ==
Take Me Back was recorded in sessions held at Sound Stage Studios, Creative Workshop and Woodland Sound Studios all located in Nashville, Tennessee. The Woodland sessions were held in July 1980. According to Billboard, MCA's A&R and Vice President was also present at the recording session. The publication also wrote that the session had "a relaxed, laidback feeling" as Lee was recording the song "Staring Each Other Down". The song was one of ten tracks on the album. Its opening track, "Broken Trust", featured country vocal group, The Oak Ridge Boys. In Lee's autobiography, Chancey was quoted in saying that the song was owned by the group's publishing company. In an effort to get the track for Lee, Chancey offered The Oak Ridge Boys to appear on the recording and they agreed to it. The album's title tune was co-written by Elton John and was first recorded by him for his album, 21 at 33. Another track, "What Am I Gonna Do", was written by Kim Carnes.

== Critical reception ==
Take Me Back received a positive response from writers and publications at the time of its release. Billboard placed in its "Top Album Picks" in October 1980, calling it a "superb package" with "artful strings, subtle keyboards and steady percussion". Cash Box praised Lee's voice throughout the album, writing, "Lee turns in a fine performance on this number, as well as every tune on the package. That hefty voice in a little girl's frame hasn't lost one drop of the magic that catapulted her to fame when she was barely 12 years old." Canadian newspaper, the Windsor Star positively compared Lee's ability to individualize her performances to that of Anne Murray and believed the album would provide "good listening for years to come".

== Release, chart performance and singles ==
Take Me Back was released by MCA Records in October 1980 as a vinyl LP and was Lee's twenty ninth studio album. It became Lee's sixth disc to make the US Billboard Top Country Albums chart. Debuting on November 22, 1980, it spent ten weeks on the chart and peaked at the number 30 position on December 13. Take Me Back also became Lee's first album to make the chart since 1976's L. A. Sessions. Two singles were included on the album, with its earliest being "Broken Trust" (issued by MCA in September 1980). It became a top ten single on the US Hot Country Songs chart, rising to the number nine position and a top 20 song on Canada's Country Tracks chart, peaking at number 14. The second single issued from Take Me Back was "Every Now and Then" (released by MCA in January 1981). It made the top 40 of the US country chart, peaking at number 26 and reached number 43 on the Canadian Country Tracks chart.

== Track listing ==
Side one
No.	Title	Writer(s)	Length
1.	"Broken Trust" (Vocal accompaniment by The Oak Ridge Boys)	Jimbeau Hinson	3:43
2.	"What Am I Gonna Do"	Kim Carnes; Dave Ellingson	2:52
3.	"Every Now and Then"	Shayne Dolan; Rock Killough	3:12
4.	"Take Me Back"	Elton John; Gary Osborne	3:38
5.	"You Put It All Together"	Gloria Sklerov; Sam Kunin	3:40

Side two
No.	Title	Writer(s)	Length
1.	"Staring Each Other Down"	Chips Moman; Bobby Emmons	3:24
2.	"Right Behind the Rain"	Al Cunningham; Charlie Black	2:51
3.	"Cracker Jack Diamonds"	Van Stephenson; Danny Morrison; Johnny Slate	2:53
4.	"He'll Play the Music (But You Can't Make Him Dance)"	David Wilkins; Jody Johnson; Chic Doherty	2:54
5.	"Too Many Nights Alone"	Even Stevens; Shel Silverstein	3:50

== Personnel ==
All credits are adapted from the liner notes of Take Me Back.

Musical personnel

- Lea Jane Berinati – Voices
- Byrd Burton – Lead guitar, acoustic guitar
- Kenneth Buttrey – Drums
- James Capps – Rhythm guitar
- Johnny Christopher – Acoustic guitar
- Bobby Emmons – Keyboards
- Buddy Emmons – Steel guitar
- Mary Fielder – Background voices
- Vicki Hampton – Background oices
- Yvonne Hodges – Background voices
- Shane Keister – Keyboards
- Sheldon Kurland Strings – Strings
- Brenda Lee – Lead vocals
- Donna McElroy – Voices
- Weldon Myrick – Steel guitar
- Ron Oates – Keyboards
- Billy Sanford – Lead guitar
- Randy Scruggs – Lead guitar
- Jerry Shook – Acoustic guitar
- Paul Uhrig – Bass
- Jack Williams – Bass
- Bobby Wood – Keyboards
- Chip Young – Rhythm guitar
- Reggie Young – Lead guitar

Technical personnel

- Ron Chancey – Producer
- Les Ladd – Recording, mixing
- Frank Laffitte – Photography
- George Osaki – Art direction
- Bill Tom – Design
- Bergen White – String arrangements

== Chart performance ==
Chart (1980)	Peak position
US Top Country Albums (Billboard)	30

== Release history ==
Release history and formats for Take Me Back
Region	Date	Format	Label	Ref.
Various	October 1980	Vinyl LP	MCA Records	
Various	Circa 2026	Music download; streaming	MCA Nashville	
