= Terry Carisse =

Canadian singer

- Born: Terrance Victor Carisse; July 11, 1942; Ottawa, Ontario, Canada
- Died: May 22, 2005 (aged 62) Ottawa, Ontario, Canada
- Genres: Country
- Occupation: Singer
- Years active: 1960s–2000s
- Labels: MBS, Savannah
- Website: terrycarisse.com

Terrance Victor Carisse (July 11, 1942 – May 22, 2005) known as Terry Carisse, was one of Canadian Country Music's most awarded, decorated and popular singer-songwriters. His awards include the Canadian Country Music Association's Male Vocalist of the Year Award which he has won six times, and still holds this record. He was nominated four times for a Juno Award. In 1989 he was inducted into the Ottawa Valley Country Music Hall of Fame. In 2006, Terry Carisse was inducted into the Canadian Country Music Hall of Fame.

== Biography ==
=== Early life ===
Carisse was born Terrance Victor Carisse July 11, 1942, in Ottawa, Ontario, Canada. He started performing in his early teens. at several local talent shows and festivals in the Ottawa Valley.

=== Career ===
In 1971, Carisse teamed up with fellow songwriter Bruce Rawlins. The duo wrote their first hit song together "Hello Mom" for the Mercey Brothers.

Beginning in 1978, Carisse and his band, Tenderfoot, were the opening act for Carroll Baker, performing concert dates in Canada, Great Britain, including the London Palladium. After performing as part of the Carroll Baker show from 1978 to 1980, he began a solo career. In 1980, Carisse left the Carroll Baker Show to tour with his new band, Tracks. Performing in such venues as the Calgary Stampede, the Big Valley Jamboree in Regina, fairs in Lethbridge and Charlottetown, and the first-ever national telecast of the Canadian Country Music Awards(CCMA). Carisse and his band Tracks opened for Kenny Rogers and Dolly Parton in Atlantic Canada and toured with, among many others, Larry Gatlin and the Gatlin Brothers, Conway Twitty, Loretta Lynn, Tammy Wynette, Mel Tillis, and Willie Nelson. Carisse has appeared in numerous shows including The Family Brown, The Tommy Hunter Show and the International Country Music Festival in Peterborough, England as well as writing and performing three songs on "The Rowdyman" film starring Gordon Pinsent. He recorded his first album on the Mercey Brothers' MBS label and later recorded with Savannah Records. Over the years, Carisse has released six albums and numerous singles, initially on the Mercey Brothers MBS label and, subsequently, on Savannah Records. His songs have been recorded by Carroll Baker, Marie Bottrell, Ralph Carlson, Bruce Golden, "Whispering Bill" Anderson, Charlie Louvin, Australian country singer, Allan Hawking, the Netherlands' Esther Tims, and Sweden's Teddy Nelson, and his songs have been released in Germany, Australia, Switzerland, Belgium, the Netherlands and Luxembourg. In 1989 Terry was inducted into the Ottawa Valley Country Music Hall of Fame and in 2006 he was inducted into The Canadian Country Music Hall of Fame.

Carisse died of cancer on May 22, 2005, in an Ottawa hospital; he was 62. Carisse is survived by his wife Aija (Skadins) and sons Steve, Chris, and Sean and a brother, Stephen.

== Discography ==
=== Albums ===
Year	Album	CAN Country
1978	Terry Carisse	—
1979	Story of the Year	19
1980	We Could Make Beautiful Music Together	13
1982	A Gospel Gathering	—
1984	The Closest Thing to You	25
1986	None of the Feeling Is Gone	—
1989	That Was a Long Time Ago	—

=== Singles ===
Year	Single	Chart Positions		Album
Year	Single	CAN Country	CAN AC	Album
1976	"I've Been Thinking"	—	—	single only
1978	"Lonely Highway Blues"	26	—	Story of the Year
1978	"The Story of the Year"	30	—	Story of the Year
1979	"Time to Go"	15	34	Story of the Year
1979	"Sparkle in Her Eyes"	1	—	Story of the Year
1980	"All Her Letters"	10	—	Story of the Year
1980	"We Could Make Beautiful Music Together"	10	15	We Could Make Beautiful Music Together
1981	"Windship"	7	—	We Could Make Beautiful Music Together
1981	"Ode to an Outlaw's Lady"	17	—	We Could Make Beautiful Music Together
1982	"Coming Undone Again"	23	—	We Could Make Beautiful Music Together
1982	"Nevada"	—	—	single only
1983	"Love Blind"	—	—	The Closest Thing to You
1984	"The Closest Thing to You"	17	—	The Closest Thing to You
1984	"Two Broken Hearts"	17	—	The Closest Thing to You
1985	"Counting the I Love Yous"	13	—	The Closest Thing to You
1985	"Sweet Blue"	10	20	The Closest Thing to You
1986	"Love Sweet Love"	6	28	None of the Feeling Is Gone
1986	"It Must Be October"	23	—	None of the Feeling Is Gone
1987	"Old Photographs"	3	—	None of the Feeling Is Gone
1987	"Starting Forever Again"	10	—	None of the Feeling Is Gone
1987	"None of the Feeling Is Gone" (with Michelle Wright)	13	—	None of the Feeling Is Gone
1987	"Give In"	12	—	None of the Feeling Is Gone
1988	"Thought Leaving Would Be Easy"	8	—	None of the Feeling Is Gone
1989	"Loveproof Heart"	28	—	That Was a Long Time Ago
1989	"What About Her"	36	—	That Was a Long Time Ago
1990	"Start of Something New" (with Tracey Brown)	6	—	That Was a Long Time Ago
1990	"Is Your Heart Taken"	22	—	That Was a Long Time Ago
1991	"That Was a Long Time Ago"	38	—	That Was a Long Time Ago
1992	"My Old Man"	—	—	single only
1994	"Daddy's Girl"	—	—	single only
2005	"Because of You"	—	—	single only
