= Canadian Country Music Association =

Association of the Canadian country music industry

The Canadian Country Music Association (CCMA) was founded in 1976 as the Academy of Country Music Entertainment to organize, promote and develop a Canadian country music industry. The groundwork for the association began on June 3, 1973, when a group of twelve entertainers, promoters and radio personalities met at The Horseshoe Tavern in Toronto, Ontario, and formed a board of directors to help promote Canadian content. The group included Jury Krytiuk, president of Boot Records, Bod Dalton, a promotor, Sean Eyre, DJ Lindsay, radio personality Harold Moon who worked for BMI Records, Jack Starr of The Horseshoe Tavern, Barry Haugen of RCA Records, Vic Folliott of Brantford Radio, Mary Butterill of the Composers, Authors and Publishers Association of Canada, Ben Kerr who was a musician and promoter, and Brent Williams, a notable country and bluegrass entertainer. This group was aided by future Country Music Awards organizer and Country Music Hall of Fame inductee Joe Talbot who flew up from Nashville especially for this meeting. The association changed its name to the Canadian Country Music Association in 1987.

The CCMA held the first Canadian Country Music Awards ceremony in 1982. CCMA members vote in a three-stage ballot process to determine the winners of the awards. The first ballot consists of potential candidates nominated by the CCMA voting membership in a "write in" ballot. The top ten contenders for each award are presented in the second ballot period, where they are voted upon for the third (and final) ballot. In this ballot, the top five contenders are announced, who then go through to the awards show.

Country Music Week is an annual event planned by the CCMA. It is hosted by a different Canadian city each year, and culminates with the CCMA Awards on the Sunday night. There are three components to Country Music Week: a music festival (which includes a Fan Fest, Legends Show, and Songwriters Series), the CCMA Awards show, and an industry conference (which includes workshops and seminars, networking events, and awards ceremonies).

== Awards ceremonies ==
Year	Location	Fans' Choice Award	Male Artist of the Year	Female Artist of the Year	Group or Duo of the Year	Host(s)
1977	Ottawa, ON	No awards presented; Country Music Week only.				
1978	Regina, SK	No awards presented; Country Music Week only.				
1979	Toronto, ON	No awards presented; Country Music Week only.				
1980	Winnipeg, MB	No awards presented; Country Music Week only.				
1981	Ottawa, ON	No awards presented; Country Music Week only.				
1982	Halifax, NS	Family Brown	Terry Carisse	Carroll Baker	Ronnie Prophet and Glory-Anne Carriere	
1983	Regina, SK	Family Brown	Dick Damron	Marie Bottrell	Ronnie Prophet and Glory-Anne Carriere	
1984	Moncton, NB	Ronnie Prophet	Terry Carisse	Marie Bottrell	Ronnie Prophet and Glory-Anne Carriere	
1985	Edmonton, AB	Dick Damron	Terry Carisse	Carroll Baker	Mercey Brothers	
1986	Winnipeg, MB	Family Brown	Terry Carisse	Anita Perras	Family Brown	
1987	Vancouver, BC	k.d. lang	Ian Tyson	Anita Perras	Family Brown	
1988	Toronto, ON	k.d. lang	Ian Tyson	k.d. lang	Family Brown	
1989	Ottawa, ON	k.d. lang	Gary Fjellgaard	k.d. lang	Family Brown	
1990	Edmonton, AB	k.d. lang	George Fox	Michelle Wright	Prairie Oyster	
1991	Hamilton, ON	Rita MacNeil	George Fox	Michelle Wright	Prairie Oyster	
1992	Cochrane, AB	Rita MacNeil	Ian Tyson	Michelle Wright	Prairie Oyster	George Fox
1993	Hamilton, ON	Michelle Wright	George Fox	Michelle Wright	The Rankin Family	
1994	Calgary, AB	Prairie Oyster	Charlie Major	Patricia Conroy	Prairie Oyster	
1995	Hamilton, ON	Michelle Wright	Charlie Major	Shania Twain	Prairie Oyster	
1996	Calgary, AB	Shania Twain	Charlie Major	Shania Twain	Prairie Oyster	
1997	Hamilton, ON	Terri Clark	Paul Brandt	Terri Clark	Farmer's Daughter	
1998	Calgary, ON	Shania Twain	Paul Brandt	Shania Twain	Leahy	Terri Clark
1999	Ottawa, ON	Shania Twain	Paul Brandt	Shania Twain	The Wilkinsons	
2000	Edmonton, AB	The Wilkinsons	Paul Brandt	Michelle Wright	The Wilkinsons	
2001	Calgary, AB	Terri Clark	Jason McCoy	Carolyn Dawn Johnson	The Wilkinsons	
2002	Calgary, AB	Terri Clark	Paul Brandt	Carolyn Dawn Johnson	Emerson Drive	
2003	Calgary, AB	Terri Clark	Aaron Lines	Shania Twain	Emerson Drive	
2004	Edmonton, AB	Terri Clark	Jason McCoy	Terri Clark	Doc Walker	
2005	Calgary, AB	George Canyon	George Canyon	Terri Clark	The Road Hammers	
2006	Saint John, NB	Terri Clark	George Canyon	Carolyn Dawn Johnson	The Road Hammers	
2007	Regina, SK	Terri Clark	Brad Johner	Carolyn Dawn Johnson	Emerson Drive	
2008	Winnipeg, MB	Doc Walker	Johnny Reid	Jessie Farrell	Doc Walker	
2009	Vancouver, BC	Johnny Reid	Johnny Reid	Crystal Shawanda	Doc Walker	
2010	Edmonton, AB	Johnny Reid	Gord Bamford	Victoria Banks	Doc Walker	
2011	Hamilton, ON	Johnny Reid	Johnny Reid	Terri Clark	Hey Romeo	
2012	Saskatoon, SK	Johnny Reid	Dean Brody	Carolyn Dawn Johnson	Hey Romeo	
2013	Edmonton, AB	Terri Clark	Dean Brody	Kira Isabella	The Stellas	
2014	Edmonton, AB	Johnny Reid	Gord Bamford	Jess Moskaluke	Small Town Pistols	
2015	Halifax, NS	Johnny Reid	Gord Bamford	Jess Moskaluke	High Valley	
2016	London, ON	Brett Kissel	Brett Kissel	Jess Moskaluke	High Valley	
2017	Saskatoon, SK	Brett Kissel	Dean Brody	Meghan Patrick	The Road Hammers	
2018	Hamilton, ON	Shania Twain	Dallas Smith	Meghan Patrick	The Washboard Union	Shania Twain
2019	Calgary, AB	Brett Kissel	Dallas Smith	Tenille Townes	The Washboard Union	Dallas Smith, Billy Ray Cyrus
2020	Oro-Medonte, ON	Brett Kissel	Brett Kissel	Tenille Townes	The Washboard Union	
2021	London, ON	Brett Kissel	Dallas Smith	Tenille Townes	The Reklaws	Lindsay Ell, Priyanka
2022	Calgary, AB	Dallas Smith	Dallas Smith	Tenille Townes	The Reklaws	Blanco Brown, Tenille Townes
2023	Hamilton, ON	James Barker Band	Jade Eagleson	Tenille Townes	James Barker Band	The Reklaws
2024	Edmonton, AB	James Barker Band	Josh Ross	MacKenzie Porter	James Barker Band	MacKenzie Porter, Thomas Rhett
2025	Kelowna, BC	Cameron Whitcomb	Jade Eagleson	MacKenzie Porter	James Barker Band	Tom Green
2026	Saskatoon, SK	James Barker Band	Cameron Whitcomb	Meghan Patrick	James Barker Band	James Barker Band

== CCMA Awards ==
The CCMA held the first Canadian Country Music Awards ceremony in 1982. CCMA members vote in a three-stage ballot process to determine the winners of the awards. The first ballot consists of potential candidates nominated by the CCMA voting membership in a "write in" ballot. The top ten contenders for each award are presented in the second ballot period, where they are voted upon for the third (and final) ballot. In this ballot, the top five contenders are announced, who then go through to the awards show.

Since 2019, the CCMA Awards have been broadcast by Global, replacing previous broadcaster CBC Television.

2020

Award	Winner
Entertainer of the Year	Dallas Smith
Fans' Choice Award	Brett Kissel
Male Artist of the Year	Brett Kissel
Female Artist of the Year	Tenille Townes
Group or Duo of the Year	The Washboard Union
Songwriter(s) of the Year	“Jersey on the Wall (I’m Just Asking)” – Tina Parol, Gordie Sampson, Tenille Townes
Single of the Year	“Keep It Simple” – James Barker Band
Album of the Year	Now Or Never – Brett Kissel
Rising Star	Tenille Arts
Interactive Artist of the Year	Lindsay Ell
Video of the Year	“Jersey on the Wall (I'm Just Asking)” – Tenille Townes

2019

Award	Winner
Entertainer of the Year	Dallas Smith
Fans' Choice Award	Brett Kissel
Male Artist of the Year	Dallas Smith
Female Artist of the Year	Tenille Townes
Group or Duo of the Year	The Washboard Union
Songwriter(s) of the Year	"Somebody's Daughter" - Barry Dean, Luke Laird, Tenille Townes
Single of the Year	"Somebody's Daughter" - Tenille Townes
Album of the Year	Feels Like That - The Reklaws
Rising Star	Jade Eagleson
Roots Artist or Group of the Year	Donovan Woods/The Washboard Union
Interactive Artist of the Year	Lindsay Ell
Video of the Year	"Somebody's Daughter" - Tenille Townes

2018

Award	Winner
Fans' Choice Award	Shania Twain
Male Artist of the Year	Dallas Smith
Female Artist of the Year	Meghan Patrick
Group or Duo of the Year	The Washboard Union
Songwriter(s) of the Year	"Lonely Drum" - Alexander Black, Aaron Goodvin, Cathy Gravitt (performed by Aaron Goodvin)
Single of the Year	"Chills" - James Barker Band
Album of the Year	Past the Past - Jess Moskaluke
Top Selling Album of the Year	Now - Shania Twain
Top Selling Canadian Album of the Year	Now - Shania Twain
Rising Star	The Reklaws
Roots Artist or Group of the Year	The Washboard Union
Interactive Artist of the Year	Brett Kissel
Video of the Year	Sky Stays This Blue - Dallas Smith
Generation Award	Shania Twain

2017

Award	Winner
Fans' Choice Award	Dean Brody
Male Artist of the Year	Brett Kissel
Female Artist of the Year	Meghan Patrick
Group or Duo of the Year	The Road Hammers
Songwriter(s) of the Year	"Time" - Dean Brody (Dean Brody)
Single of the Year	"Autograph" - Dallas Smith
Album of the Year	Side Effects - Dallas Smith
Top Selling Album	Ripcord - Keith Urban
Top Selling Canadian Album	Side Effects - Dallas Smith
Rising Star	Meghan Patrick
Roots Artist or Group of the Year	The Washboard Union
Interactive Artist of the Year	Brett Kissel

2016

Award	Winner
Fans' Choice Award	Brett Kissel
Male Artist of the Year	Brett Kissel
Female Artist of the Year	Jess Moskaluke
Group or Duo of the Year	High Valley
Songwriter(s) of the Year	"Bring Down the House" - Dean Brody (Dean Brody)
Single of the Year	"Bring Down the House" - Dean Brody
Album of the Year	Tin Roof - Gord Bamford
Top Selling Album	Kill the Lights - Luke Bryan
Top Selling Canadian Album	Yoan - Yoan
CMT Video of the Year	Bring Down the House" - Dean Brody
Rising Star	The Washboard Union
Roots Artist or Group of the Year	The Washboard Union
Interactive Artist of the Year	Brett Kissel

2015

Award	Winner
Fans' Choice Award	Johnny Reid
Male Artist of the Year	Gord Bamford
Female Artist of the Year	Jess Moskaluke
Group or Duo of the Year	High Valley
Songwriter(s) of the Year	"Where a Farm Used to Be" - Gord Bamford, Buddy Owens, Phil O'Donnell (Gord Bamford)
Single of the Year	"Where a Farm Used to Be" - Gord Bamford
Album of the Year	Lifted - Dallas Smith
Top Selling Album	Crash My Party - Luke Bryan
Top Selling Canadian Album	Yoan - Yoan
CMT Video of the Year	"Upside Down" - Dean Brody
Rising Star	Madeline Merlo
Roots Artist or Group of the Year	Lindi Ortega
Interactive Artist of the Year	Brett Kissel

2014

Award	Winner
Fans' Choice Award	Johnny Reid
Male Artist of the Year	Gord Bamford
Female Artist of the Year	Jess Moskaluke
Group or Duo of the Year	Small Town Pistols
Songwriter(s) of the Year	"Mine Would Be You" - Jessi Alexander, Connie Harrington, Deric Ruttan (Blake Shelton)
Single of the Year	"When Your Lips Are So Close" - Gord Bamford
Album of the Year	Crop Circles - Dean Brody
Top Selling Album	Here's to the Good Times - Florida Georgia Line
Top Selling Canadian Album	A Christmas Gift to You - Johnny Reid
CMT Video of the Year	"3-2-1" - Brett Kissel
Rising Star	Tim Hicks
Roots Artist or Group of the Year	Lindi Ortega
Interactive Artist of the Year	Brett Kissel

2013

Award	Winner
Fans' Choice Award	Terri Clark
Male Artist of the Year	Dean Brody
Female Artist of the Year	Kira Isabella
Group or Duo of the Year	The Stellas
Songwriter(s) of the Year	"Leaning on a Lonesome Song" - Gord Bamford, Buddy Owens, Ray Stephenson (Gord Bamford)
Single of the Year	"Leaning on a Lonesome Song" - Gord Bamford
Album of the Year	Is It Friday Yet? - Gord Bamford
Top Selling Album	Red - Taylor Swift
Top Selling Canadian Album	Fire It Up - Johnny Reid
CMT Video of the Year	"Leaning on a Lonesome Song" - Gord Bamford
Rising Star	Bobby Wills
Roots Artist or Group of the Year	Corb Lund
Interactive Artist of the Year	High Valley

2012

Award	Winner
Fans' Choice Award	Johnny Reid
Male Artist of the Year	Dean Brody
Female Artist of the Year	Carolyn Dawn Johnson
Group or Duo of the Year	Hey Romeo
Songwriter(s) of the Year	"Is It Friday Yet?" - Gord Bamford, Roger Brown, Byron Hill - Gord Bamford
Single of the Year	"They Don't Make 'Em Like That Anymore" - Jason Blaine
Album of the Year	Dirt - Dean Brody
Top Selling Album	Own the Night - Lady Antebellum
Top Selling Canadian Album	Fire It Up - Johnny Reid
CMT Video of the Year	"In This House" - The Stellas
Rising Star	Kira Isabella
Roots Artist or Group of the Year	Jimmy Rankin
Generation Award	Taylor Swift

2011

Award	Winner
Fans' Choice Award	Johnny Reid
Male Artist of the Year	Johnny Reid
Female Artist of the Year	Terri Clark
Group or Duo of the Year	Hey Romeo
Songwriter(s) of the Year	"Trail in Life" - Dean Brody (Dean Brody)
Single of the Year	"Trail in Life" - Dean Brody
Album of the Year	Trail in Life - Dean Brody
Top Selling Album	Speak Now - Taylor Swift
Top Selling Canadian Album	A Place Called Love - Johnny Reid
CMT Video of the Year	"Today I'm Gonna Try and Change the World" - Johnny Reid
Rising Star	Chad Brownlee
Roots Artist or Group of the Year	Jimmy Rankin

2010

Award	Winner
Fans' Choice Award	Johnny Reid
Male Artist of the Year	Gord Bamford
Female Artist of the Year	Victoria Banks
Group or Duo of the Year	Doc Walker
Songwriter(s) of the Year	"Dance with Me" - Victoria Banks, Johnny Reid, Tia Sillers (Johnny Reid)
Single of the Year	"Dance with Me" - Johnny Reid
Album of the Year	Day Job - Gord Bamford
Top Selling Album	Fearless - Taylor Swift
Top Selling Canadian Album	Dance with Me - Johnny Reid
CMT Video of the Year	"Day Job" - Gord Bamford
Rising Star	One More Girl
Roots Artist or Group of the Year	Corb Lund

2009

Award	Winner
Fans' Choice Award	Johnny Reid
Male Artist of the Year	Johnny Reid
Female Artist of the Year	Crystal Shawanda
Group or Duo of the Year	Doc Walker
Songwriter(s) of the Year	"A Woman Like You" - Johnny Reid, Brent Maher (Johnny Reid)
Single of the Year	"Brothers" - Dean Brody
Album of the Year	Dance with Me - Johnny Reid
Top Selling Album	Fearless - Taylor Swift
Top Selling Canadian Album	Dance with Me - Johnny Reid
CMT Video of the Year	"A Woman Like You" - Johnny Reid
Rising Star	Tara Oram
Roots Artist or Group of the Year	Corb Lund

2008

Award	Winner
Fans' Choice Award	Doc Walker
Male Artist of the Year	Johnny Reid
Female Artist of the Year	Jessie Farrell
Group or Duo of the Year	Doc Walker
Songwriter(s) of the Year	"Beautiful Life" - Murray Pulver, Chris Thorsteinson, Dave Wasyliw (Doc Walker)
Single of the Year	"Beautiful Life" - Doc Walker
Album of the Year	Beautiful Life - Doc Walker
Top Selling Album	The Ultimate Hits - Garth Brooks
Top Selling Canadian Album	Kicking Stones - Johnny Reid
CMT Video of the Year	"Beautiful Life" - Doc Walker
Top New Talent of the Year	Jessie Farrell
Roots Artist or Group of the Year	Corb Lund
Top New Talent of the Year - Group or Duo	Hey Romeo
Top Male Talent of the Year	Gord Bamford
Top Female Talent of the Year	Jessie Farrell

2007

Award	Winner
Kraft Cheez Whiz Fans' Choice Award	Terri Clark
Male Artist of the Year	Brad Johner
Female Artist of the Year	Carolyn Dawn Johnson
Group or Duo of the Year	Emerson Drive
Songwriter(s) of the Year	"Hold My Beer" - Mitch Merrett, Aaron Pritchett, Deric Ruttan (Aaron Pritchett)
Single of the Year	"Moments" - Emerson Drive
Album of the Year	Doc Walker - Doc Walker
Top Selling Album	Taking the Long Way - Dixie Chicks
CMT Video of the Year	"Moments" - Emerson Drive
Chevy Trucks Rising Star Award	Shane Yellowbird
Roots Artist or Group of the Year	Corb Lund

2006

Award	Winner
Kraft Cheez Whiz Fans' Choice Award	Terri Clark
Male Artist of the Year	George Canyon
Female Artist of the Year	Carolyn Dawn Johnson
Group or Duo of the Year	The Road Hammers
Songwriter(s) of the Year	"Jesus, Take the Wheel" - Brett James, Hillary Lindsey, Gordie Sampson (Carrie Underwood)
Single of the Year	"Somebody Wrote Love" - George Canyon
Album of the Year	Hair in My Eyes Like a Highland Steer - Corb Lund
Top Selling Album	The Legend Of Johnny Cash - Johnny Cash
CMT Video of the Year	"East Bound And Down" - The Road Hammers
Chevy Trucks Rising Star Award	Johnny Reid
Roots Artist or Group of the Year	Corb Lund

2005

Award	Winner
Kraft Cheez Whiz Fans' Choice Award	George Canyon
Male Artist of the Year	George Canyon
Female Artist of the Year	Terri Clark
Group or Duo of the Year	The Road Hammers
Songwriter(s) of the Year	"My Name" - George Canyon, Gordie Sampson (George Canyon)
Single of the Year	"My Name" - George Canyon
Album of the Year	This Time Around - Paul Brandt
Top Selling Album	Greatest Hits - Shania Twain
CMT Video of the Year	"Convoy" - Paul Brandt
Chevy Trucks Rising Star Award	Amanda Wilkinson
Roots Artist or Group of the Year	Corb Lund

2004

Award	Winner
Kraft Cheez Whiz Fans' Choice Award	Terri Clark
Male Artist of the Year	Jason McCoy
Female Artist of the Year	Terri Clark
Group or Duo of the Year	Doc Walker
Songwriter(s) of the Year	"Die Of A Broken Heart" - Carolyn Dawn Johnson (Carolyn Dawn Johnson)
Single of the Year	"Simple Life" - Carolyn Dawn Johnson
Album of the Year	Dress Rehearsal - Carolyn Dawn Johnson
Top Selling Album	Greatest Hits Volume II - Alan Jackson
CMT Video of the Year	"Simple Life" - Carolyn Dawn Johnson
Chevy Trucks Rising Star Award	George Canyon
Roots Artist or Group of the Year	Corb Lund
Country Music Program of the Year	Up! Close and Personal - Shania Twain

2003

Award	Winner
Kraft Cheez Whiz Fans' Choice Award	Terri Clark
Male Artist of the Year	Aaron Lines
Female Artist of the Year	Shania Twain
Group or Duo of the Year	Emerson Drive
Songwriter(s) of the Year	"Rocket Girl" - Jason McCoy, Denny Carr (Doc Walker)
Single of the Year	"I Just Wanna Be Mad" - Terri Clark
Album of the Year	Up! - Shania Twain
Top Selling Album	Up! - Shania Twain
CMT Video of the Year	"I'm Gonna Getcha Good!" - Shania Twain
Chevy Trucks Rising Star Award	Aaron Lines
Roots Artist or Group of the Year	Sean Hogan

2002

Award	Winner
Fans' Choice Award	Terri Clark
Male Artist of the Year	Paul Brandt
Female Artist of the Year	Carolyn Dawn Johnson
Group or Duo of the Year	Emerson Drive
Songwriter(s) of the Year	"Ten Million Teardrops" - Jason McCoy, Tim Taylor (Jason McCoy)
Single of the Year	"I Don't Want You to Go" - Carolyn Dawn Johnson
Album of the Year	Small Towns and Big Dreams - Paul Brandt
Top Selling Album	Scarecrow - Garth Brooks
CMT Video of the Year	"I Don't Want You to Go" - Carolyn Dawn Johnson
Chevy Trucks Rising Star Award	Emerson Drive
Roots Artist or Group of the Year	Jimmy Rankin

2001

Award	Winner
Telus Mobility Fans' Choice Award	Terri Clark
Male Artist of the Year	Jason McCoy
Female Artist of the Year	Carolyn Dawn Johnson
Group or Duo of the Year	The Wilkinsons
Songwriter(s) of the Year	"Complicated" - Carolyn Dawn Johnson (Carolyn Dawn Johnson)
Single of the Year	"Complicated" - Carolyn Dawn Johnson
Album of the Year	Room With A View - Carolyn Dawn Johnson
Top Selling Album	Breathe - Faith Hill
Video of the Year	"No Fear" - Terri Clark
Chevy Trucks Rising Star Award	Carolyn Dawn Johnson
Roots Artist or Group of the Year	Natalie MacMaster

2000

Award	Winner
Chevy Fans' Choice Award	The Wilkinsons
Male Artist of the Year	Paul Brandt
Female Artist of the Year	Michelle Wright
Group or Duo of the Year	The Wilkinsons
Songwriter(s) of the Year	"Daddy Won't Sell The Farm" - Steve Fox, Robin Branda (Montgomery Gentry)
Single of the Year	"Jimmy's Got A Girlfriend" - The Wilkinsons
Album of the Year	Here and Now - The Wilkinsons
Top Selling Album	Fly - Dixie Chicks
Video of the Year	"That's the Truth" - Paul Brandt
FACTOR Rising Star Award	Tara Lyn Hart
Vocal/Instrumental Collaboration of the Year	"Get Me Through December" - Natalie MacMaster & Alison Krauss

1999

Award	Winner
CMT Maple Leaf Foods Fans' Choice Award	Shania Twain
Male Artist of the Year	Paul Brandt
Female Artist of the Year	Shania Twain
Group or Duo of the Year	The Wilkinsons
Songwriter(s) of the Year	"26 Cents" - Steve Wilkinson, William Wallace (The Wilkinsons)
Single of the Year	"26 Cents" - The Wilkinsons
Album of the Year	Nothing But Love - The Wilkinsons
Top Selling Album	Wide Open Spaces - Dixie Chicks
Video of the Year	"That Don't Impress Me Much" - Shania Twain
Wrangler Rising Star Award	The Wilkinsons
Vocal/Instrumental Collaboration of the Year	"From This Moment On" - Shania Twain & Bryan White

1998

Award	Winner
CMT Maple Leaf Foods Fans' Choice Award	Shania Twain
Male Artist of the Year	Paul Brandt
Female Artist of the Year	Shania Twain
Group or Duo of the Year	Leahy
Independent Male Vocalist of the Year	Rick Tippe
Independent Female Vocalist of the Year	Beverley Mahood
Songwriter(s) of the Year	"Born Again in Dixieland" - Jason McCoy, Naoise Sheridan, Denny Carr (Jason McCoy)
Single of the Year	"You're Still the One" - Shania Twain
Album of the Year	Come On Over - Shania Twain
Top Selling Album	Come On Over - Shania Twain
Video of the Year	"Don't Be Stupid (You Know I Love You)" - Shania Twain
Wrangler Rising Star Award	Bruce Guthro
Vocal Collaboration of the Year	"Your Love" - Michelle Wright & Jim Brickman

1997

Award	Winner
CMT Maple Leaf Foods Fans' Choice Award	Terri Clark
Male Artist of the Year	Paul Brandt
Female Artist of the Year	Terri Clark
Group or Duo of the Year	Farmer's Daughter
Songwriter(s) of the Year	"I Do" - Paul Brandt (Paul Brandt)
Single of the Year	"I Do" - Paul Brandt
Album of the Year	Just the Same - Terri Clark
Top Selling Album	The Woman in Me - Shania Twain
Video of the Year	"I Do" - Paul Brandt
Wrangler Rising Star Award	Julian Austin
Vocal Collaboration of the Year	"Two Names On An Overpass" - Duane Steele & Lisa Brokop

1996

Award	Winner
NCN Fans' Choice Award	Shania Twain
Male Artist of the Year	Charlie Major
Female Artist of the Year	Shania Twain
Group or Duo of the Year	Prairie Oyster
Songwriter(s) of the Year	"My Heart Has a History" - Paul Brandt, Mark D. Sanders (Paul Brandt)
Single of the Year	"Better Things to Do" - Terri Clark
Album of the Year	Terri Clark - Terri Clark
Top Selling Album	Fresh Horses - Garth Brooks
Video of the Year	"(If You're Not in It for Love) I'm Outta Here!" - Shania Twain
Vista Rising Star Award	Terri Clark
Vocal Collaboration of the Year	Jim Witter & Cassandra Vasik

1995

Award	Winner
Bud Country Fans' Choice Award	Michelle Wright
Male Artist of the Year	Charlie Major
Female Artist of the Year	Shania Twain
Group or Duo of the Year	Prairie Oyster
Songwriter(s) of the Year	"Whose Bed Have Your Boots Been Under?" - Shania Twain (Shania Twain)
Single of the Year	"Any Man of Mine" - Shania Twain
Album of the Year	The Woman in Me - Shania Twain
Top Selling Album	The Hits - Garth Brooks
Video of the Year	"Any Man of Mine" - Shania Twain
Vista Rising Star Award	Farmer's Daughter
Vocal Collaboration of the Year	Jim Witter & Cassandra Vasik

1994

Award	Winner
Bud Country Fans' Choice Award	Prairie Oyster
Male Artist of the Year	Charlie Major
Female Artist of the Year	Patricia Conroy
Group or Duo of the Year	Prairie Oyster
Songwriter(s) of the Year	"I'm Gonna Drive You Out of My Mind" - Charlie Major, Barry Brown (Charlie Major)
Single of the Year	"I'm Gonna Drive You Out of My Mind" - Charlie Major
Album of the Year	The Other Side - Charlie Major
Top Selling Album	In Pieces - Garth Brooks
Video of the Year	"Stolen Moments" - Jim Witter
Vista Rising Star Award	Susan Aglukark
Vocal Collaboration of the Year	Quartette

1993

Award	Winner
Bud Country Fans' Choice Award	Michelle Wright
Male Artist of the Year	George Fox
Female Artist of the Year	Michelle Wright
Group or Duo of the Year	The Rankin Family
Songwriter(s) of the Year	"Backroads" - Charlie Major (Ricky Van Shelton)
Single of the Year	"He Would Be Sixteen" - Michelle Wright
Album of the Year	Bad Day For Trains - Patricia Conroy
Top Selling Album	Some Gave All - Billy Ray Cyrus
Video of the Year	"He Would Be Sixteen" - Michelle Wright
Vista Rising Star Award	The Rankin Family
Vocal Collaboration of the Year	Cassandra Vasik & Russell deCarle

1992

Award	Winner
Bud Country Fans' Choice Award	Rita MacNeil
Male Artist of the Year	Ian Tyson
Female Artist of the Year	Michelle Wright
Group or Duo of the Year	Prairie Oyster
Songwriter(s) of the Year	"Did You Fall in Love with Me" - Joan Besen (Prairie Oyster)
Single of the Year	"Take It Like a Man" - Michelle Wright
Album of the Year	Everybody Knows - Prairie Oyster
Top Selling Album	Ropin' the Wind - Garth Brooks
Video of the Year	"Take It Like a Man" - Michelle Wright
Vista Rising Star Award	Cassandra Vasik
Vocal Collaboration of the Year	Gary Fjellgaard & Linda Kidder

1991

Award	Winner
Bud Country Fans' Choice Award	Rita MacNeil
Male Artist of the Year	George Fox
Female Artist of the Year	Michelle Wright
Group of the Year	Prairie Oyster
Songwriter(s) of the Year	"Lonely You, Lonely Me" - Joan Besen (Prairie Oyster)
Single of the Year	"New Kind of Love" - Michelle Wright
Album of the Year	Michelle Wright - Michelle Wright
Top Selling Album	Home I'll Be - Rita MacNeil
Video of the Year	"Springtime In Alberta" - Ian Tyson
Vista Rising Star Award	South Mountain
Duo of the Year	The Johner Brothers

1990

Award	Winner
Bud Country Fans' Choice Award	k.d. lang
Male Artist of the Year	George Fox
Female Artist of the Year	Michelle Wright
Group of the Year	Prairie Oyster
Songwriter(s) of the Year	"Pioneers" - Barry Brown (Family Brown)
Single of the Year	"Goodbye, So Long, Hello" - Prairie Oyster
Album of the Year	Absolute Torch and Twang - k.d. lang
Top Selling Album	Rita - Rita MacNeil
Video of the Year	"Pioneers" - Family Brown
Vista Rising Star Award	Patricia Conroy
Duo of the Year	Gary Fjellgaard & Linda Kidder

1989

Award	Winner
Entertainer of the Year	k.d. lang
Male Artist of the Year	Gary Fjellgaard
Female Artist of the Year	k.d. lang
Group of the Year	Family Brown
Songwriter(s) of the Year	"Town Of Tears" - Barry Brown, Randall Prescott, Bruce Campbell (Family Brown)
Single of the Year	"Town Of Tears" - Family Brown
Album of the Year	Shadowland - k.d. lang
Top Selling Album	Old 8x10 - Randy Travis
Vista Rising Star Award	George Fox
Duo of the Year	Gary Fjellgaard & Linda Kidder

1988

Award	Winner
Entertainer of the Year	k.d. lang
Male Artist of the Year	Ian Tyson
Female Artist of the Year	k.d. lang
Group of the Year	Family Brown
Songwriter(s) of the Year	"One Smokey Rose" - Tim Taylor (Anita Perras)
Single of the Year	"One Smokey Rose" - Anita Perras
Album of the Year	Shadowland - k.d. lang
Top Selling Album	Always & Forever - Randy Travis
Vista Rising Star Award	Blue Rodeo
Duo of the Year	Anita Perras & Tim Taylor

1987

Award	Winner
Entertainer of the Year	k.d. lang
Male Artist of the Year	Ian Tyson
Female Artist of the Year	Anita Perras
Group of the Year	Family Brown
Songwriter(s) of the Year	"Heroes" - Gary Fjellgaard (Mercey Brothers)
Single of the Year	"Navajo Rug" - Ian Tyson
Album of the Year	Cowboyography - Ian Tyson
Top Selling Album	Storms of Life - Randy Travis
Vista Rising Star Award	k.d. lang
Duo of the Year	Anita Perras & Tim Taylor

1986

Award	Winner
Entertainer(s) of the Year	Family Brown
Male Artist of the Year	Terry Carisse
Female Artist of the Year	Anita Perras
Group of the Year	Family Brown
Songwriter(s) of the Year	"Now And Forever" - David Foster, Jim Vallance, Charles Randolph Goodrum (Anne Murray)
Single of the Year	"Now And Forever" - Anne Murray
Album of the Year	Feel The Fire - Family Brown
Top Selling Album	Hymns Of Gold - Carroll Baker
Vista Rising Star Award	J.K. Gulley
Duo of the Year	Anita Perras & Tim Taylor

1985

Award	Winner
Entertainer of the Year	Dick Damron
Male Artist of the Year	Terry Carisse
Female Artist of the Year	Carroll Baker
Group of the Year	Mercey Brothers
Songwriter(s) of the Year	"Counting The I Love You's" - Terry Carisse, Bruce Rawlins (Terry Carisse)
Single of the Year	"Riding On The Wind" - Gary Fjellgaard
Album of the Year	Closest Thing To You - Terry Carisse
Top Selling Album	Once Upon a Christmas - Dolly Parton & Kenny Rogers
Vista Rising Star Award	Ginny Mitchell
Duo of the Year	Anita Perras & Tim Taylor

1984

Award	Winner
Entertainer of the Year	Ronnie Prophet
Male Artist of the Year	Terry Carisse
Female Artist of the Year	Marie Bottrell
Group of the Year	Family Brown
Songwriter(s) of the Year	"Jesus It's Me Again" - Dick Damron (Dick Damron)
Single of the Year	"A Little Good News" - Anne Murray
Album of the Year	Repeat After Me - Family Brown
Top Selling Album	Eyes That See in the Dark - Kenny Rogers
Vista Rising Star Award	Roni Summers
Duo of the Year	Glory-Anne Carriere & Ronnie Prophet

1983

Award	Winner
Entertainer(s) of the Year	Family Brown
Male Artist of the Year	Dick Damron
Female Artist of the Year	Marie Bottrell
Group of the Year	Family Brown
Songwriter(s) of the Year	"Raised on Country Music" - Family Brown (Family Brown)
Single of the Year	"Raised on Country Music" - Family Brown
Album of the Year	Raised on Country Music - Family Brown
Vista Rising Star Award	Kelita Haverland
Duo of the Year	Donna & LeRoy Anderson

1982

Award	Winner
Entertainer(s) of the Year	Family Brown
Male Artist of the Year	Terry Carisse
Female Artist of the Year	Carroll Baker
Group of the Year	Family Brown
Songwriter(s) of the Year	"Some Never Stand a Chance" - Family Brown (Family Brown)
Single of the Year	"Some Never Stand a Chance" - Family Brown
Album of the Year	Raised on Country Music - Family Brown
Vista Rising Star Award	Ruth Ann

== Insurance ==
In 2013, Front Row Insurance Brokers Inc. initiated an online musical instrument insurance program for members of various Canadian music associations, including the CCMA.

== See also ==
- Canadian Country Music Hall of Fame
- CMT (Canada)
