= Barry Brown (Canadian musician) =

- Born: December 17, 1952 (age 72); Owen Sound, Ontario, Canada
- Origin: Ottawa, Ontario, Canada
- Genres: Country
- Occupation: Singer-songwriter
- Instrument: Vocals
- Years active: 1967–present
- Labels: Popular/EMI

Barry Brown (born December 17, 1952), is a Canadian country music artist and songwriter. Brown, a former member of Family Brown and Prescott-Brown. Both bands included his sister, singer Tracey Brown.

== Biography ==
Brown began performing as a member of Canada's most awarded country band, Family Brown. Following the band's disbanding, Brown went on to form Juno Award winning group Prescott-Brown with his sister Tracey and brother-in-law Randall Prescott.

Brown won the Canadian Country Music Association award for SOCAN Song of the Year in 1989 ("Trail of Tears"), 1990 ("Pioneers") and 1994 ("I'm Gonna Drive You Out of My Mind"). Brown has written numerous songs for various country artists.

== Singles ==
Year	Title	Chart Positions	Album
Year	Title	CAN Country	Album
1991	"The Whole World's in Love with You"	31	Songwriter Sessions, Vol. 1
1992	"Talk to My Heart"	59	Songwriter Sessions, Vol. 2
1996	"Cold Cold Rain"	65	Non-album song
1997	"Past Glory"	—	Non-album song
