= Family Brown =

- Origin: Ottawa, Ontario, Canada
- Genres: Country
- Years active: 1967–1990
- Labels: MCA, Ovation, RCA
- Past members: Barry Brown; Joe Brown; Lawanda Brown; Tracey Brown; Dave Dennison; Randall Prescott; Ron Sparling; Gary Spicer

Family Brown was a Canadian country music band founded in 1967 by Joe Brown (vocals, bass guitar), along with his son Barry (vocals, guitar) and daughters Lawanda and Tracey (vocals), as well as Dave Dennison (guitar) and Ron Sparling (drums). Between 1967 and 1990, the band charted several singles in both Canada and the United States. The band also won eighteen Canadian Country Music Association awards, the most received by any artist. After disbanding in 1990, Barry and Tracey Brown and Randall Prescott formed the group Prescott-Brown in 1991.

== History ==
Family Brown was founded in 1967 by frontman Joe "Papa" Brown, who was born August 30, 1925, in Amherst, Nova Scotia. Brown was a local musician who had played in two local bands before founding Family Brown, taking the role of lead singer and bass guitarist. His son, Barry Brown, and daughters Lawanda and Tracey, were also members of the band. Barry served as vocalist, songwriter and guitarist, while the daughters sang backing vocals. Rounding out the membership were lead guitarist Dave Dennison and drummer Ron Sparling, who was also the manager.

Family Brown began performing in local venues and by 1970 had moved to nationwide tours of Canada. Signed to MCA Records in 1971, the band released the single "R. R. No. 2" that year, from their self-titled album on MCA Records. By 1972, the band was the subject of a national TV show, Call It Country (later Country Way, then Family Brown Country), which taped at CJOH-TV in Ottawa, Ontario.

Throughout the 1970s and into the 1980s, the band recorded for RCA Records, recording nine studio albums and two greatest hits albums in that timespan and charting forty-three singles on the RPM Country Tracks charts. Several of their singles also charted on the country charts in the United States, including the No. 30 "But It's Cheating." They also received 3 Juno's one in 1985 for Country Group of the Year, as well as seventeen RPM Big Country Awards and eighteen Canadian Country Music Association awards, the most ever received by one act. In 1979 the band added steel guitarist/fiddle player Gary (Spike) Spicer.

After Joe Brown died in 1986, and at this time Tracey's husband Randall Prescott joined the band and served as a record producer for their final two RCA albums. The band broke up after their final performance in September 1990. In 1997, Family Brown was inducted into the Canadian Country Music Hall of Fame. Tracey charted a duet with Terry Carisse in 1990, later founding the group Prescott Brown & Lonesome Daddy (later Prescott-Brown) along with Randall Prescott and Barry Brown. The trio charted nine singles in the early 1990s and won another Juno Award. After its disbanding, Tracey charted two more singles of her own.

== List of awards ==
Family Brown received the following awards:

- 1976: RPM Big Country Award for Top Group
- 1977: RPM Big Country Award for Top Group
- 1978: RPM Big Country Award for Top Group
- 1979: RPM Big Country Award for Top Group
- 1979: RPM Big Country Award, Single of the Year ("Stay with Me")
- 1979: RPM Big Country Award, Album of the Year (Familiar Faces, Familiar Places)
- 1980: RPM Big Country Award for Top Group
- 1981: RPM Big Country Award for Top Group
- 1982: CCMA Group of the Year
- 1982: CCMA Single of the Year ("Some Never Stand a Chance")
- 1982: CCMA Song of the Year ("Some Never Stand a Chance")
- 1982: CCMA Album of the Year (Raised on Country Music)
- 1993: CCMA Entertainer of the Year
- 1983: CCMA Single of the Year ("Raised on Country Music")
- 1983: CCMA Song of the Year ("Raised on Country Music")
- 1983: CCMA Group of the Year
- 1983: CCMA Album of the Year (Raised on Country Music)
- 1983: CCMA Entertainer of the Year
- 1984: CCMA Group of the Year
- 1984: CCMA Album of the Year (Repeat After Me)
- 1985: Juno Award for Country Group of the Year
- 1985: RPM Big Country Award for Top Group
- 1985: RPM Big Country Award, Album of the Year (Feel the Fire)
- 1986: CCMA Group of the Year
- 1986: CCMA Album of the Year (Feel the Fire)
- 1987: CCMA Group of the Year
- 1987: RPM Big Country Award for Top Group
- 1988: CCMA Group of the Year
- 1989: CCMA Group of the Year
- 1989: RPM Big Country Award for Top Group
- 1989: RPM Big Country Award, Album of the Year (These Days)
- 1989: CCMA Single of the Year ("Town of Tears")
- 1989: CCMA Song of the Year ("Town of Tears")
- 1990: RPM Big Country Award for Top Group
- 1990: CCMA Song of the Year ("Pioneers")
