= For the First Time (Brenda Lee and Pete Fountain album) =

Studio album by Brenda and Pete
- Released: March 15, 1968
- Recorded: September 1967
- Genres: Jazz; pop
- Label: Decca
- Producers: Owen Bradley; Charles "Bud" Dant

Brenda Lee chronology
Reflections in Blue (1967)	For the First Time (1968)	Johnny One Time (1969)

Singles from For the First Time
- 1. "Cabaret" Released: March 1968

For the First Time is the collaborative album (and Brenda Lee’s nineteenth overall) by American singer Brenda Lee and American instrumentalist Pete Fountain. Credited under the names "Brenda and Pete", For the First Time was released by Decca Records on March 15, 1968, and featured 11 tracks. The recordings featured Lee performing lead vocals while Fountain provided instrumentation solos on his clarinet. The album was met with positive reviews from critics following its release. It also made the US albums chart in 1968.

== Background, recording and content ==
Known for her early sixties teen pop songs, Brenda Lee had found success with singles like "I'm Sorry", "All Alone Am I" and "Fool No. 1". Separately, Pete Fountain first found success as an instrumentalist performing on The Lawrence Welk Show in the late fifties. His popularity led him to opening a nightclub in New Orleans, Louisiana. The pair first met in 1960 when Fountain had first opened his New Orleans nightclub, which ultimately led to the duo performing onstage that evening. Their collaboration in 1960 led to the idea of Lee and Fountain recording together, which finally occurred later in the decade.

For the First Time was recorded in September 1967. The sessions were produced by Owen Bradley and Charles "Bud" Dant. The album was a collection of ten tracks, featuring Lee singing lead vocals and Fountain performing solos on the clarinet. Music chosen for the project was Jazz and pop-influenced. Its opening track was the song "Cabaret" from the musical of the same name. Another musical theater song included on the album was the song "Anything Goes" from the musical of the same name. The pairing also covered pop songs of the era such as "The 59th Street Bridge Song (Feelin' Groovy)".

== Release, reception, chart performance and singles ==
Professional ratings
Review scores
Source	Rating
Allmusic	3/5 stars

For the First Time was released by Decca Records on March 15, 1968. It was distributed as a vinyl LP with five selections on side one and six selections on side two. The disc credited the performers under the title "Brenda and Pete". The album was met with positive reviews from critics and publications. Billboard found the duo "complement[ed] each other splendidly". Cashbox also remarked positively of the pairing between Lee and Fountain. "The LP should prove popular with a wide listenership," they concluded. AllMusic's Greg Adams gave the disc three out of five stars and wrote, "For the First Time isn't a masterpiece, but it does make one wonder whether Brenda Lee could have gained acceptance in the jazz field. After all, if Teresa Brewer did it..."

For the First Time featured one single as well. The duo's version of "Cabaret" was released as a seven-inch single in March 1968 by Decca. The disc reached a charting position on the US Billboard 200 record survey in 1968, peaking at number 187. It was among Brenda Lee's lowest-charting albums on Billboard and her first to chart since 1966. It was Fountain's only charting Billboard album.

== Track listing ==
Side one
No.	Title	Writer(s)	Length
1.	"Cabaret" (from the musical production Cabaret)	Fred Ebb; John Kander	2:55
2.	"There's a Kind of Hush"	Geoff Stephens; Les Reed	2:40
3.	"Basin Street Blues"	Spencer Williams	3:59
4.	"Windy"	Ruthann Friedman	2:45
5.	"Night and Day"	Cole Porter	2:59

Side two
No.	Title	Writer(s)	Length
1.	"One Of Those Songs (Le Bal De Mo: Temouille)"	Will Holt; Gerard Calvi	2:36
2.	"Mood Indigo"	Duke Ellington; Barney Bigard; Irving Mills	3:28
3.	"Can't Take My Eyes Off You"	Bob Crewe; Bob Gaudio	3:59
4.	"The 59th Street Bridge Song (Feelin' Groovy)"	Paul Simon	2:45
5.	"Anything Goes"	Porter	2:20
6.	"I Gotta Right to Sing the Blues"	Harold Arlen; Ted Koehler	3:27

== Personnel ==
All credits are adapted from the liner notes of For the First Time.

- Owen Bradley – Producer
- Hal Buksbaum – Cover photo
- Charles "Bud" Dant – Director, producer
- Brenda Lee – Vocals
- Pete Fountain – Clarinet

== Chart performance ==
Chart (1968)	Peak position
US Billboard 200	187
