= The Majesty of Love =

- Advertisement for the single by MGM

Single by Connie Francis and Marvin Rainwater
- B-side: You, My Darlin' ,You
- Released: 1957
- Genre: Country pop
- Label: MGM
- Songwriters: Ben Raleigh, Don Wolf

Connie Francis singles chronology
"Eighteen" (1957)	"The Majesty of Love" (1957)	"Who's Sorry Now" (1957)

Marvin Rainwater singles chronology
"Gonna Find Me a Bluebird" (1957)	"The Majesty of Love" (1957)	"Whole Lotta Woman" (1958)

"The Majesty of Love" is a duet single by Connie Francis and Marvin Rainwater, released in 1957 by MGM Records. It made brief chart appearances.

== Background ==
In 1955, George Franconero Sr. and Francis's manager George Scheck raised money for a recording session of four songs, which they hoped to sell to a major record company under Francis's own name. Even when MGM Records decided to sign a contract with her, it was because one track she had recorded, "Freddy", happened to be the name of the son of a company executive, Harry A. Meyerson, who thought of the song as a nice birthday gift. Hence, "Freddy" was released as Francis's first single, which turned out to be a commercial failure, just like her next eight solo singles. The recording contract consisted of ten solo singles and one duet single.

== Overview ==
Written by Ben Raleigh and Don Wolf, the duet single with Marvin Rainwater was her most successful single yet, reaching No. 93 on the Billboard Hot 100, No. 76 on Record World, (then called Music Vendor), and doing well in Australia, reaching a peak position of No. 37 there. However, her minor chart success came too late. Francis was informed by MGM Records that her contract would not be renewed after her last solo single. Despite this, the single sold over one million copies, becoming her first million seller and Rainwater's second.

== Charts ==
Chart (1957)	Peak position
US Billboard Hot 100	93
US Music Vendor (Record World)	76
Australia (Kent Music Report)	37
