= 10 Golden Years =

Compilation album by Brenda Lee
- Released: May 23, 1966
- Recorded: 1956–1965
- Genres: Nashville Sound; Rockabilly; pop
- Label: Decca
- Producer: Owen Bradley

Brenda Lee chronology
Bye Bye Blues (1965)	10 Golden Years (1966)	Coming on Strong (1966)

10 Golden Years is the first compilation album by American singer Brenda Lee. The album was released on May 23, 1966, by Decca Records and consisted of ten tracks. The album was meant as a celebration of Lee's ten years as a recording artist for the Decca label. It featured ten tracks recorded between 1956 and 1965, many of which were her most popular singles from her career up to that point.

== Background and content ==
Brenda Lee first signed with Decca Records in 1956 in her preteen years. She early recordings such as "Dynamite" were in the Rockabilly style. Her recordings then moved towards pop with songs like "I'm Sorry", "Fool No. 1", "All Alone Am I" and "Losing You". Lee continued recording for Decca through the 1960s and was continuing to have charting records. The year 1966 marked Lee's ten-year anniversary recording for Decca and the label celebrated it by deciding to create a compilation of her material. 10 Golden Years consisted of ten tracks recorded between 1956 and 1965. Featured on the album were her chart records from the previous ten years. This included songs like "Sweet Nothins", "I'm Sorry" and "All Alone Am I".

== Release, reception and chart performance ==
10 Golden Years was released on May 23, 1966, by Decca Records. It was distributed as a vinyl LP with five selections on each side of the record. It was promoted through a "coast-to-coast" program, which included radio station visits. Decca also supplied material to record stores that allowed for them to display the record in their store windows. The album was reviewed positively by Billboard. The magazine took notice in Lee's "growth" as a singer. Record World commented that the album will be "a collector's item that will sell fast". AllMusic gave the disc a three-star rating. The disc reached the number 70 position on the US Billboard 200 in 1966. It was the first compilation album in Lee's career to make the any US record chart.

== Track listing ==
Side one
No.	Title	Writer(s)	Length
1.	"Jambalaya (On the Bayou)"	Hank Williams	2:06
2.	"Dynamite"	Mort Garson; Tom Glazer	1:57
3.	"Bill Bailey, Won't You Please Come Home"	Hughie Cannon	2:19
4.	"Sweet Nothin's"	Ronnie Self	2:20
5.	"I'm Sorry"	Self	2:40

Side two
No.	Title	Writer(s)	Length
1.	"Fool #1"	Kathryn R. Fulton	2:22
2.	"Dum Dum"	Jackie DeShannon; Sharon Sheeley	2:27
3.	"All Alone Am I"	Arthur Altman; Manos Hadjidakis	2:37
4.	"As Usual"	Alex Zanetis	2:32
5.	"Too Many Rivers"	Harlan Howard	2:46

== Personnel ==
All credits are adapted from the liner notes of 10 Golden Years.

- Dub Allbritten – Liner Notes
- Owen Bradley – Producer

== Chart performance ==
Chart (1966)	Peak position
US Billboard 200	70
