= Coming on Strong =

Coming on Strong may refer to:

- "Coming On Strong" (song), a song by Brenda Lee
- Coming on Strong (Brenda Lee album), 1966
- Coming on Strong (Hot Chip album), 2004

== See also ==
- Comin' On Strong, a 2003 album by Trace Adkins
- Comin' On Strong (James Moody album), 1963
- "Comin' On Strong" (Broken English song), 1987
- "Comin' On Strong" (Desiya song), 1991
