= Reflections in Blue =

Reflections in Blue may refer to:

- Reflections in Blue (Brenda Lee album), recorded in 1967
- Reflections in Blue (Art Blakey album), recorded in 1978
- Reflections in Blue (Sun Ra album), recorded in 1986
