= Brenda, That's All =

Studio album by Brenda Lee
- Released: October 15, 1962
- Genres: Pop; R&B; country
- Label: Decca
- Producer: Owen Bradley

Brenda Lee chronology
Sincerely (1962)	Brenda, That's All (1962)	All Alone Am I (1963)

Singles from Brenda, That's All
- 1. "You Can Depend on Me" Released: March 1961; 2. "Fool #1" Released: September 1961

Brenda, That's All is the seventh studio album by American singer, Brenda Lee. It was released by Decca Records on October 15, 1962 and was her seventh studio album. The 12-track disc consisted of a variety of material that featured new songs and covers. Its musical variety was highlighted and praised by critics. Of its new songs were two singles that made the top-10 in the US: "You Can Depend on Me" and "Fool No. 1". Brenda, That's All made the top-20 on the US and UK album charts as well.

== Background, recording and content ==
Brenda Lee found success at a young age in the fields of rock and pop with a series of major hits from the 1950s through the 1960s. A series of albums were released featuring Lee's material during the 1960s, among them being 1962's Brenda, That's All. The project was credited to Lee's producer, Owen Bradley, and consisted of 12 tracks in total. It followed a trend of previous Brenda Lee releases to included a range of material, that AllMusic's Richie Unterberger theorized was meant to "highlight her versatility". Brenda, That's All tapped into the genres of pop, R&B and country and included both uptempo and slow tempo tracks. Covers on the album included "You Can Depend on Me" and "Gonna Find Me a Bluebird".

== Critical reception ==
Professional ratings
Review scores
Source	Rating
Allmusic	3.5/5 stars

Brenda, That's All received mostly positive reviews from writers and publications. Billboard highlighted "Why Me", "White Silver Sands" and "Valley of Tears as "listenable goodies". The publication concluded its review by writing, "In all, a solid set that should keep cash registers ringing and stations spinning the tracks." Cash Box said it was "One of the best sessions that the songstress has cut in quite a while", highlighting the album's current singles and its several cover tunes. Richie Unterberger from AllMusic gave the project a 3.5 star rating, finding it also had better quality material that previous Lee albums. He concluded by stating, "The whole album is impressively sung and immaculately produced, in fact, in common with much of what Lee recorded under Owen Bradley's direction."

== Release, chart performance and singles ==
Brenda, That's All was released by Decca Records on October 15, 1962 and was originally offered in two separate vinyl LP formats: monaural or stereo. It was the seventh studio project of her career. The disc made its debut on the US Billboard 200 chart on November 3, 1962, debuting at number 97. It spent 22 weeks on the chart and ultimately rose to the number 20 position on December 3, 1962. It was Lee's sixth album to make the Billboard 200. It also became her second album to make the UK Albums Chart, peaking at the number 13 position around the same time period. Two singles were included on Brenda, That's All with its earliest single being "You Can Depend on Me" (issued in March 1961 by Decca). It notably climbed to number six on the US Hot 100, becoming her sixth top-10 single on that chart. The second single included on the disc was "Fool No. 1", which Decca first issued in September 1961. It became her seventh top-10 single on the US Hot 100, rising to number three, along with reaching the top-40 on the UK Singles Chart.

== Track listing ==
Side one
No.	Title	Writer(s)	Length
1.	"I'm Sitting on Top of the World"	Ray Henderson; Joe Young; Sam M. Lewis	2:08
2.	"Fool #1"	Kathryn R. Fulton	2:22
3.	"White Silver Sands"	G. Reinhart; R. Matthews	3:06
4.	"Just Out of Reach"	V. F. Stewart	2:44
5.	"Sweethearts on Parade"	Carmen Lombardo; Charles Newman	2:15
6.	"It's a Lonesome Old Town (When You're Not Around)"	Harry Tobias; Charles Kisco	3:06

Side two
No.	Title	Writer(s)	Length
1.	"Organ Grinder's Swing"	Will Hudson; Mitchell Parish; Irving Mills	2:24
2.	"Gonna Find Me a Bluebird"	Marvin Rainwater	2:47
3.	"Why Me?"	Bob Beckham; Buzz Cason	2:10
4.	"Valley of Tears"	Dave Bartholomew; Antoine Domino	2:26
5.	"Someday You'll Want Me to Want You"	Jimmie Hodges	2:35
6.	"You Can Depend on Me"	Charles Carpenter; Louis Dunlap; Earl Hines	3:34

== Chart performance ==
Chart (1962)	Peak position
UK Albums (Official Charts)	13
US Billboard 200	20

== Release history ==
Release history and formats for Brenda, That's All
Region	Date	Format	Label	Ref.
Various	October 15, 1962	LP mono; LP stereo	Brunswick; Decca; Festival; Fab Five; Life	
Various	Circa 1963	LP mono; LP stereo	Brunswick	
Various	Circa 2020	Music download; streaming	MCA Nashville	
