= Bye Bye Blues =

"Bye Bye Blues" may refer to:

- "Bye Bye Blues" (song), a popular song
- Bye Bye Blues (album), a 1966 album by Brenda Lee
- "Bye Bye Blues " (song) by Stela Cole, released in 2022
- Bye Bye Blues (film), a 1989 Canadian film
