= Half-Fast Walking Club =

US musical group

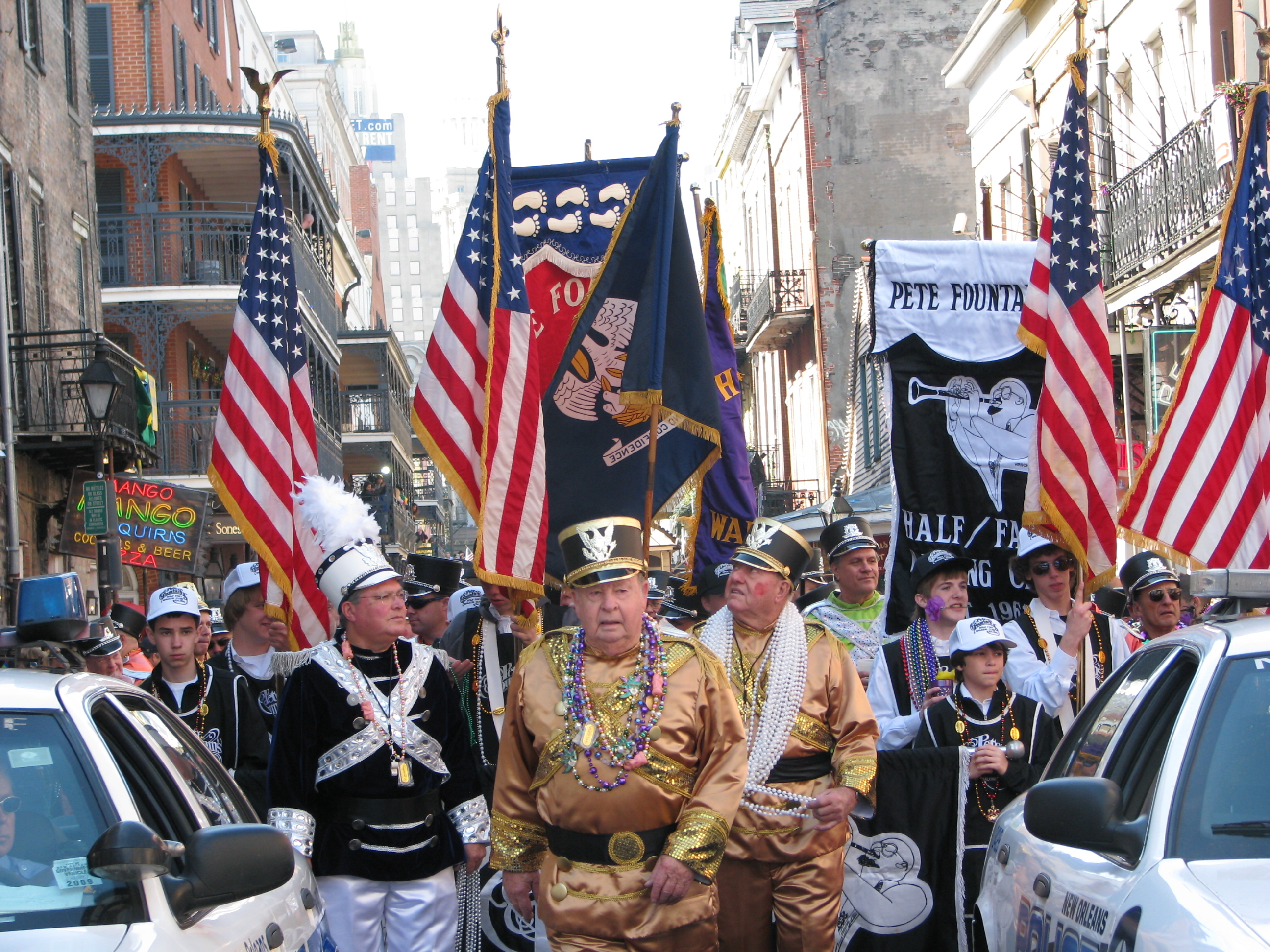
- Half-Fast Walking Club, Mardi Gras Day 2009

Background information
- Origin: New Orleans, Louisiana, USA
- Genres: Jazz, Mardi Gras music

The Half-Fast Walking Club is a New Orleans Mardi Gras krewe founded and historically led by Pete Fountain, until his death on August 6, 2016. Originally all on foot, in recent decades it has also featured one or two small floats. Fountain and other local jazz musicians played through much of the parade. The krewe's current route, basically unchanged since the mid-1970s, starts at 7 AM on Mardi Gras morning, at world-famous Commander's Palace Restaurant on Washington Avenue in the Garden District. The krewe then proceeds downtown on St. Charles Avenue and after a brief interlude on Canal Street, enters the French Quarter at Bourbon Street, winds around the Quarter and eventually ends up at the Monteleone Hotel in the early afternoon.

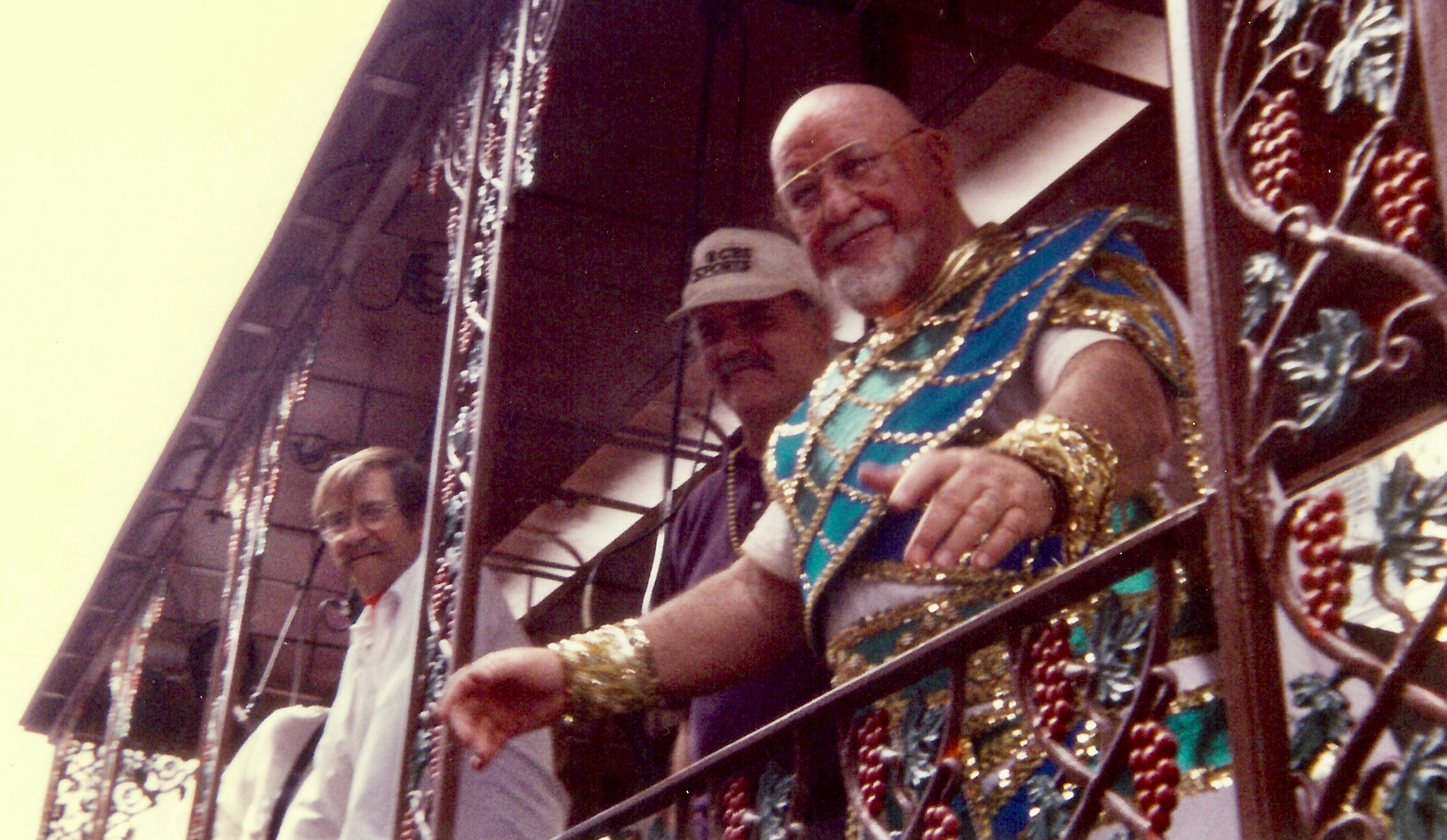
Jazz greats Connie Jones and Pete Fountain on "Half-Fast" band float, Mardi Gras 1996

The "Half-Fast" is one of the best known marching Krewes that parades in New Orleans on Mardi Gras. The original name was "The Half-Assed Walking Club" and was an excuse to take a "lubricated" musical stroll down the parade route. Pete changed the name under pressure exerted by the parade organizers. On Mardi Gras 2007 Pete once again joined his Half Fast Walking Club, having missed the event in 2006 due to illness. He died in 2016.

One of the more famous members of the Half-Fast Walking Club was singer and bandleader Phil Harris, famous as a Disney voice and as Jack Benny's orchestra leader. In his last appearance in 1990, Harris did not walk due poor health but was chauffeured in a convertible while waving to the crowd and throwing trinkets.
