= Panama (jazz standard) =

1912 song by William Henry Tyers

Song
- Published: 1911 by Leo Feist, Inc.
- Composer: William Henry Tyers

Recording
- Performed by the Dixie Players of the United States Air Force Heritage of America Band: file; help

"Panama" (sometimes incorrectly called "Panama Rag") is a jazz standard. It is by William Henry Tyers, originally entitled "Panama, a Characteristic Novelty", published in 1912.

Jazz legends who have played and recorded the song include the New Orleans Rhythm Kings, Luis Russell, Kid Ory, the Eureka Brass Band, and Humphrey Lyttelton. The famous trumpet variation commonly played by New Orleans bands and those influenced by the New Orleans style was reportedly devised by Manuel Manetta, who first taught it to his star trumpet pupils Emmett Hardy and Red Allen.

The original tango or maxixe rhythm is usually discarded in favor of 4/4 time, but can still be detected in some versions, such as the early recording by Johnny DeDroit's Band.

Some later generations have sometimes confused it with a totally different piece of a similar name, a ragtime number composed by Charles Seymour in 1904 called "Panama Rag". This lesser known number has been recorded by the New Orleans Ragtime Orchestra and was reportedly played by Buddy Bolden when the tune was new, but is rather obscure and far from a standard.

== Recordings ==
- Friar's Society Orchestra (New Orleans Rhythm Kings w Leon Roppolo) (1922)
- Luis Russell And His Orchestra. New York, September 5, 1930.
- Bunk Johnson and his New Orleans Band. Recorded in New Orleans on June 11, 1942.
- Louis Armstrong and the All Stars. Recorded in New York City on April 26–27, 1950. Released on the Decca Records LP Vol. 2 - Jazz Concert.
- Basin Street Six. Mercury Records 78 rpm side (cat. no. 70219) released in 1953.
- The Big Chief Jazz Band. Recorded in Oslo, Norway, on June 7, 1955. Released on the 78 rpm record Philips P 53033 H.
- Al Hirt released a version on his 1963 album, Our Man in New Orleans.
