= Rock Salt & Nails =

Rock Salt & Nails may refer to:

- "Rock Salt & Nails" a song written by Utah Phillips and covered by many artists
- Rock Salt & Nails (album), an album by Steve Young
