= You Can Depend on Me (Louis Armstrong song) =

"You Can Depend on Me" is a song written by Charles Carpenter, Louis Dunlap and Earl "Fatha" Hines, first recorded by Louis Armstrong in 1931 and released as a 10-inch 78 rpm shellac record on the Columbia label. A live version was released in 1951 on Armstrong's album Satchmo at Pasadena. It should not be confused with the song of the same name, "(You Can) Depend on Me", recorded by Smokey Robinson and the Miracles in 1959.

== Other recorded versions ==
The song has been recorded and performed by several people, including: Count Basie, Dexter Gordon and Nat King Cole.

=== Brenda Lee version ===
"You Can Depend on Me"

Single by Brenda Lee

from the album Brenda, That's All
- B-side: "It's Never Too Late"
- Released: March 1961
- Recorded: 1 January 1961
- Genre: Vocal jazz
- Length: 3:34
- Label: Decca
- Songwriter(s): Charles Carpenter, Louis Dunlap, Earl Hines
- Producer(s): Owen Bradley

Brenda Lee singles chronology
"Rockin' Around the Christmas Tree" (1961)	"You Can Depend on Me" (1961)	"Dum Dum" (1961)

Brenda Lee's cover of "You Can Depend on Me" was released as a single in March 1961 and reached No. 6 on the Billboard Pop Singles chart in May 1961. The single crossed over to the Hot R&B Sides chart, where it reached No. 25. This recording was featured on Lee's 1962 album Brenda, That's All.

== Influences ==
Recorded in 1949, the notable Lennie Tristano contrafact "Wow" is based on the chord changes to "You Can Depend on Me".
