= Connie Jones =

American jazz trumpeter and cornetist (1934–2019)

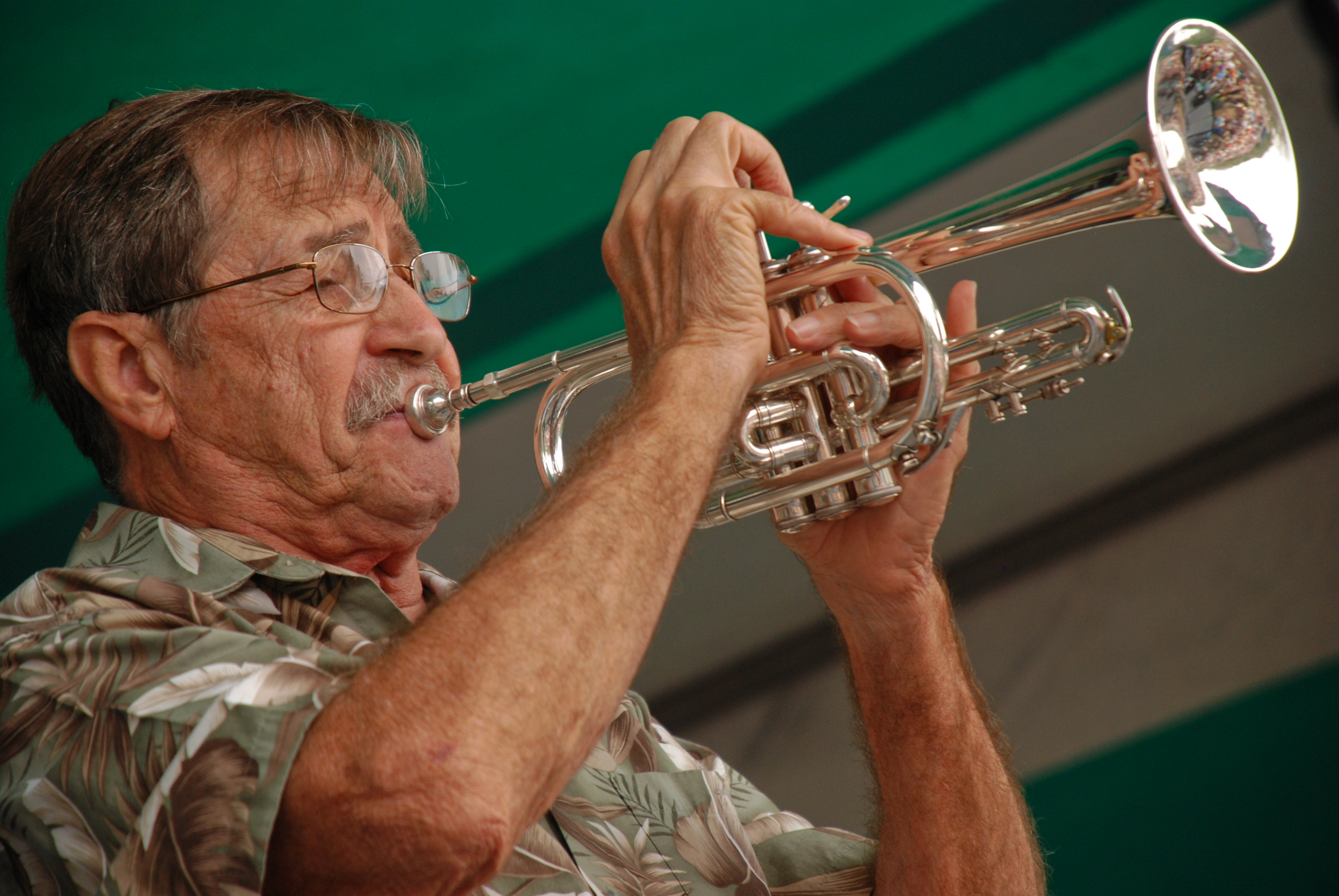
- Jones performing at the French Quarter Festival in 2009

Background information
- Born: March 22, 1934; New Orleans, Louisiana
- Died: February 14, 2019 (aged 84); New Orleans, Louisiana, U.S.
- Genres: Jazz
- Occupation: Jazz trumpeter
- Instrument(s): Cornet, trumpet, bugle

Conrad Rodman "Connie" Jones III (March 22, 1934 – February 14, 2019) was an American jazz trumpeter and cornetist from New Orleans.

Jones started playing the bugle while in military school, and later changed to trumpet at age 10. His first professional band was the Basin Street Six, a traditional New Orleans jazz group led by him and Pete Fountain. Fountain became Jones' long-time friend and collaborator.

Before starting his own group, Jones played in the bands of Billy Maxted and Santo Pecora. He was also in Jack Teagarden's group when Teagarden died in 1964. As a bandleader he played in the Blue Angel nightclub and later aboard the Mississippi steamboat Delta Queen. In 2008, Jones recorded the album Creole Nocturne with pianist Tom McDermott. and "If Dreams Come True" in 2011 with clarinetist Tim Laughlin.

Among his many television credits are The Today Show, The Tonight Show, and The Mike Douglas Show. He was featured at venues worldwide, including The New Orleans Jazz and Heritage Festival, the Satchmo SummerFest, the Evergreen Jazz Festival (to name a few) and Jones continued to perform at the French Quarter Festival in New Orleans until his retirement in 2016. His band (The Crescent City Jazz Band) was the opening act of the festival for nine years in a row, followed by a long run of openings by the Connie Jones All-Stars. Jones was also part of the festival's entertainment committee in 2009.

Connie Jones is renowned as one of the most talented musicians to emerge from New Orleans and received an honorary degree from Loyola University in May 2012.

He announced his retirement in April, 2016, and died in 2019.
