= All Alone Am I (album) =

Studio album by Brenda Lee
- Released: February 18, 1963
- Recorded: August 9 – December 12, 1962
- Studio: Bradley Studios, Nashville, Tennessee
- Genre: Pop
- Length: 31:18
- Label: Decca
- Producer: Owen Bradley

Brenda Lee chronology
Brenda, That's All (1962)	All Alone Am I (1963)	..."Let Me Sing" (1963)

Singles from All Alone Am I
- 1. "All Alone Am I" Released: September 1962

Professional ratings
Review scores
Source	Rating
Allmusic	3/5 stars
New Record Mirror	4/5 stars

All Alone Am I is the eighth studio album by American singer Brenda Lee. The album was released February 18, 1963, on Decca Records and was produced by Owen Bradley. The album was the first of two studio albums released in 1963 and the album's title track became a Top 10 hit on the Billboard Hot 100.

== Background and content ==
"All Alone Am I" was originally composed by the Greek composer Manos Hadjidakis and recorded in Greek by Tzeni Karezi for the soundtrack of the film To nisi ton genneon (The Island of the Brave); the original song in Greek is titled "Μην τον ρωτάς τον ουρανό" ("Min ton rotas ton ourano", translation: "Don't ask the sky"). Later, a new version of the song with English lyrics was produced by Owen Bradley and appeared as the title track on one of Lee's albums. The song is written in the key of F major, but begins on the sub-dominant B-flat Major 7th chord. All Alone Am I was recorded in four separate sessions at the Bradley Film and Recording Studio in Nashville, Tennessee, United States. The first session began August 9, 1962, and the final session took place December 12, 1962, all of which were produced by Owen Bradley. All Alone Am I contained twelve tracks and many of which were cover versions of previously recorded pop music standards. It included cover versions of Tony Bennett's "I Left My Heart in San Francisco", Cole Porter's "It's All Right with Me", and Les Paul's "Lover". Many of the album's tracks were Pop music standards, which tried to reinforce the impression, "that her album market was viewed as being a more mature audience than the more youthful one responsible for buying a high percentage of her smash 45s," according to Richie Unterbeger of Allmusic. Unterberger gave the album three out of five stars. The album was originally released on an LP record, containing six songs on the "A-side" of the record and six on the "B-side" of the record. The album has never been reissued on a compact disc in the United States, but has been reissued as such in the United Kingdom. In addition, the album is also available on extended play in the United States and Brazil.

== Release ==
All Alone Am I spawned its title track as the first single. Released in September 1962, the single reached No.3 on the Billboard Hot 100 and became Lee's first single to chart on the Billboard Easy Listening chart, reaching No.1 in late-1962. In addition, the single also reached No.7 on the singles chart in the United Kingdom in late-February 1963, becoming only her second single since 1960 (the first was Rockin' Around the Christmas Tree, a U.K. No.6 in December 1962) to be released both in the U.S. and overseas to succeed in peaking in the Top 10 of a country other than the United States (although Lee had had two Top 5 singles in the U.K. in 1962 with Speak to Me Pretty and Here Comes That Feeling, neither of which had been single A-sides in the U.S.).

The All Alone Am I album itself was officially released on February 18, 1963, on Decca Records. The album would later peak at No.25 on the Billboard 200 albums chart and reach No.8 on the UK Albums Chart, becoming one of Lee's final entries on the UK album chart and her highest-peaking entry on the chart as well.

== Track listing ==
Side one

1. "All Alone Am I" (Arthur Altman, Manos Hadjidakis) – 2:45
2. "By Myself" (Howard Dietz, Arthur Schwartz) – 2:11
3. "I Left My Heart in San Francisco" (George Cory, Douglass Cross) – 2:48
4. "It's All Right with Me" (Cole Porter) – 2:40
5. "My Coloring Book" (Fred Ebb, John Kander) – 3:50
6. "My Prayer" (Georges Boulanger, Jimmy Kennedy) – 2:45

Side two

1. "Lover" (Lorenz Hart, Richard Rodgers) – 2:16
2. "All by Myself" (Irving Berlin) – 2:36
3. "What Kind of Fool Am I" (Leslie Bricusse, Anthony Newley) – 2:16
4. "Come Rain or Come Shine" (Harold Arlen, Johnny Mercer) – 2:32
5. "I Hadn't Anyone Till You" (Ray Noble) – 2:37
6. "Fly Me to the Moon" (Bart Howard) – 2:22

== Personnel ==
- Harold Bradley – guitar
- Floyd Cramer – piano
- Dottie Dillard – background vocals
- Ray Edenton – guitar
- Buddy Emmons – steel guitar
- Buddy Harman – drums
- Anita Kerr – background vocals
- Douglas Kirkham – drums
- Brenda Lee – lead vocals
- Grady Martin – guitar
- Bill McElhiney – arranger
- Bob Moore – bass
- Cam Mullins – arranger
- Louis Nunley – background vocals
- Boots Randolph – saxophone
- Bill Wright – background vocals

== Sales chart positions ==
Album

Chart (1963)	Peak position
U.S. Billboard 200	25
U.K. Albums Chart	8

Singles

Year	Song	Peak chart positions		
Year	Song	US	US AC	UK
1962	"All Alone Am I"	3	1	7

== Release history ==
Release history and formats for All Alone Am I
Region	Date	Format	Label	Ref.
North America	February 18, 1963	Vinyl LP	Decca Records	
