= Coming On Strong (Brenda Lee album) =

Coming on Strong

Studio album by Brenda Lee
- Released: November 28, 1966
- Recorded: August–September 1966
- Studios: Bradley's Barn, Mount Juliet, Tennessee
- Genres: Adult contemporary; Nashville Sound; pop
- Label: Decca
- Producer: Owen Bradley

Brenda Lee chronology
| 10 Golden Years (1966) | Coming on Strong (1966) | Reflections in Blue (1967) |

Singles from Coming on Strong
- 1. "Coming on Strong" Released: September 1966

Coming on Strong is the seventeenth studio album by American singer Brenda Lee. It was released on November 28, 1966, via Decca Records. The album consisted of ten tracks, many of which were covers of songs recorded by other artists. The album's title track was the only single included. It reached the top 20 on the US record chart and the top ten of the Canadian record chart. The album itself also made the US chart following its release. Coming Strong received mixed reviews from critics following its release.

== Background, recording and content ==
Considered a "child prodigy", Brenda Lee was signed to Decca Records as a preteen and recorded predominantly as a Rockabilly artist. In her teens, she graduated to pop material and would have her greatest commercial success. Songs like "I'm Sorry", "Dum Dum", "Break It to Me Gently" and "All Alone Am I" were top ten US chart songs. As the decade progressed, Lee's commercial success began to wane. Yet, her singles managed to reach the top 20 in the US while also being popular in other countries. Her last US top 20 entry was the 1966 single "Coming on Strong". Her album of the same name was released in 1966 and featured the song.

Coming on Strong was recorded at Bradley's Barn, a studio located in Mount Juliet, Tennessee and owned by the album's producer, Owen Bradley. Sessions for the album were held between August and September 1966. The album project consisted of 12 tracks. A variety of music styles were represented on the album. Many of the album's material were cover songs of recent singles by other artists. This included Lee's rendition of "You Don't Have to Say You Love Me", "What Now My Love", "Crying Time" and "Uptight (Everything's Alright)".

== Release and critical reception ==
Professional ratings
Review scores
| Source | Rating |
|---|---|
| Allmusic | 2.5/5 stars |

Coming on Strong was released by Decca Records on November 28, 1966. It was the seventeenth studio project in Lee's career. The album was distributed as a vinyl LP, with six selections on both sides of the record. Coming on Strong was met with mixed reviews from critics. Billboard called the album an "exceptional package" and found that Lee "adds her own magic" to the cover songs on the track listing. Cashbox magazine also gave Coming on Strong a positive review. In referencing her vocal performance, the magazine wrote, "The perennial top selling artist has done it again". Meanwhile, AllMusic only rated the album 2.5 out of 5 possible stars. Critic Greg Adams found the album project to be "an underwhelming collection of adult contemporary material with a heavy emphasis on ballads". Furthermore, Adams concluded, "'Coming on Strong' is an excellent single that shows that Brenda Lee could still hit with quality material, but the remainder of the album is too middle-of-the-road in its execution to be fully satisfying."

== Chart performance and singles ==
Coming on Strong reached the number 94 position on the US Billboard 200 record chart in 1966. It was Lee's second studio album to consecutively reach the number 94 position the chart. It was also her third album (including her 1966 compilation 10 Golden Years) to make the Billboard 200 in 1966. It was also among Lee's lowest charting releases that made the Billboard 200. The title track was the album's only single included. The single was originally released by Decca in September 1966. The song was Lee's last top 20 entry on the US Hot 100, reaching the number 11 position. Internationally, it reached number 76 in Australia while reaching the top ten in Canada, peaking at number nine.

== Track listing ==
Side one
| No. | Title | Writer(s) | Length |
|---|---|---|---|
| 1. | "Coming on Strong" | David Wilkins | 2:00 |
| 2. | "You Don't Have to Say You Love Me" | Vicki Wickham; Simon Napier-Bell; Pino Donaggio; Vito Pallavicini | 2:53 |
| 3. | "Summer Wind" | Heinz Meier; Hans Bradtke; Johnny Mercer | 2:12 |
| 4. | "Kiss Away" | Billy Sherrill; Glenn Sutton | 2:52 |
| 5. | "Call Me" | Tony Hatch | 2:30 |
| 6. | "What Now My Love" | Pierre Delanoë; Carl Sigman; Gilbert Bécaud | 2:00 |

Side two
| No. | Title | Writer(s) | Length |
|---|---|---|---|
| 1. | "Uptight (Everything's Alright)" | Stevie Wonder; Sylvia Moy; Henry Cosby | 2:06 |
| 2. | "Crying Time" | Buck Owens | 3:12 |
| 3. | "Strangers in the Night" | Bert Kaempfert; Charles Singleton; Eddie Snyder | 2:29 |
| 4. | "Sweet Dreams (Of You)" | Don Gibson | 2:51 |
| 5. | "You've Got Your Troubles" | Roger Greenaway; Roger Cook | 2:32 |
| 6. | "Somewhere" | Leonard Bernstein; Stephen Sondheim | 2:04 |

== Personnel ==
All credits are adapted from the liner notes of Coming on Strong.

- Owen Bradley – Producer
- Cliff Parman – Arrangements
- Bill McElhiney – Arrangements

== Chart performance ==
| Chart (1966) | Peak position |
|---|---|
| US Billboard 200 | 94 |

== Release history ==
| Region | Date | Format | Label | Ref. |
|---|---|---|---|---|
| Australia; New Zealand | November 28, 1966 | Vinyl LP (Mono); Vinyl LP (Stereo) | Festival Records | |
| Japan | November 28, 1966 | Vinyl LP (Stereo) | Decca Records | |
| North America | November 28, 1966 | Vinyl LP (Mono); Vinyl LP (Stereo) | Decca Records | |
| United Kingdom | November 28, 1966 | Vinyl LP (Mono); Vinyl LP (Stereo) | Brunswick Records | |
| Brazil | 1967 | Vinyl LP (Mono) | Decca Records | |
| Singapore | 1968 | Vinyl LP (Stereo) | Life Records | |
| Japan | 1975 | Vinyl LP | MCA Coral | |
| Various | Circa 2026 | Music download; streaming | MCA Nashville | |
