= Seven Bridges Road (album) =

Studio album by Steve Young
- Released: January 1972
- Recorded: 1971
- Studio: Fred F. Carter Jr. Studios, Goodlettsville, Tennessee
- Genre: Outlaw Country, Country rock
- Length: 37:23
- Label: Reprise
- Producer: David Briggs

Steve Young chronology
| Rock Salt & Nails (1969) | Seven Bridges Road (1972) | Honky Tonk Man (1975) |

Professional ratings
Review scores
| Source | Rating |
|---|---|
| Allmusic | 4.5/5 stars |

Seven Bridges Road is the second album by pioneer outlaw country musician Steve Young.

== Track listing ==
All tracks composed by Steve Young; except where indicated

1. "Seven Bridges Road" - 3:22
2. "My Oklahoma" (Cheryl A. Young) - 2:58
3. "The White Trash Song" - 2:50
4. "I Can't Hold Myself in Line" (Merle Haggard) - 2:15
5. "I Begin to See Design" (Steve Young, Cheryl A. Young) - 2:56
6. "Long Way to Hollywood" - 3:49
7. "Many Rivers" - 2:57
8. "Lonesome, On'ry and Mean" - 3:30
9. "Come Sit By My Side" (Fred Carter, Jr.) - 2:56
10. "True Note" - 2:55
11. "Ragtime Blue Guitar" - 2:45
12. "Montgomery in the Rain" - 4:08

Blue Canyon Records 1973 re-issue track listing:

1. "Seven Bridges Road"
2. "My Oklahoma"
3. "The White Trash Song"
4. "I Can't Hold Myself In Line"
5. "I Begin To See Design"
6. "Long Way To Hollywood"
7. "Many Rivers"
8. "Lonesome, On'ry And Mean"
9. "Come Sit By My Side"
10. "True Note"
11. "Ragtime Blue Guitar"
12. "Montgomery In The Rain"

Rounder Records 1981 re-issue track listing:

1. "Seven Bridges Road"
2. "Montgomery In The Rain"
3. "Ragtime Blue Guitar"
4. "Long Way To Hollywood"
5. "Down in the Flood"
6. "Ballad of William Sycamore"
7. "My Oklahoma"
8. "Wild Goose"
9. "Days of 49"
10. "Lonesome, On'ry And Mean"

The Ace Records CD Seven Bridges Road: The Complete Recordings, combines the Reprise Records version of the LP with additional tracks from the other two versions, plus a non-LP single.

== Personnel ==
- Steve Young - guitar, vocals
- Pete Drake - steel guitar
- Weldon Myrick - steel guitar
- Josh Graves - dobro
- Buddy Spicher - fiddle
- Charlie McCoy - harmonica
- David Briggs - keyboards
- Fred Carter, Jr. - bass
- D.J. Fontana - drums
- Bobby Thompson - guitar
- Junior Brown - guitar
- Ray Edenton - guitar
- Bob Moore - guitar
- John Goldthwaite - guitar
- Dale Sellers - guitar
- Pete Wade - guitar
- Jerry Smith - keyboards
- William Ackerman - drums
- Jerry Carrigan - drums
- Henry Strzelecki - bass
- Paul Tannen - vocals
- Ginger Holladay - vocals
- Mary Holladay - vocals

== Production ==
- Producer: David Briggs
- Recording Engineer: unknown
- Art Direction: unknown
- Photography: unknown
- Liner notes: unknown
