= Rusty Bells =

- Japanese release picture sleeve

Single by Brenda Lee

from the album Bye Bye Blues
- B-side: "If You Don't (Not Like You)"
- Released: September 1965
- Genre: Pop
- Length: 2:26
- Label: Decca Records 31849
- Songwriter(s): Eddie Snyder, Richard Ahlert

Brenda Lee singles chronology
"Too Many Rivers" (1965)	"Rusty Bells" (1965)	"Too Little Time" (1966)

"Rusty Bells" is a song written by Eddie Snyder and Richard Ahlert and performed by Brenda Lee. The song reached #3 on the adult contemporary chart and #33 on the Billboard Hot 100 in 1965. It was featured on her 1966 album, Bye Bye Blues.

The song was arranged by Bill McElhiney and Cam Mullins.

== Other versions ==
- Milva released a version of the song entitled "Una Campana" in 1966 as the B-side to "Occhi Spagnoli".
- Mireille Mathieu released a French version of the song entitled "Qu'elle est Belle" in 1966.
