= No Place to Fall =

Studio album by Steve Young
- Released: September 1978
- Recorded: 1978
- Genre: Country
- Label: RCA
- Producer: Roy Dea

Steve Young chronology
Renegade Picker (1976)	No Place to Fall (1978)	To Satisfy You (1981)

Professional ratings
Review scores
Source	Rating
AllMusic	4/5 stars
The New Rolling Stone Record Guide	4/5 stars

No Place to Fall is an album by the American musician Steve Young, released in 1978. It was produced by Roy Dea. The title track was written by Townes Van Zandt.

== Track listing ==
All tracks composed by Steve Young; except where indicated

1. "No Place to Fall" (Townes Van Zandt)
2. "Montgomery in the Rain"
3. "Dreamer"
4. "Always Loving You"
5. "Drift Away" (Mentor Williams)
6. "Seven Bridges Road"
7. "I Closed My Heart's Door" (Ralph Jones, Stoney Cooper)
8. "Don't Think Twice, It's All Right" (Bob Dylan)
9. "I Can't Sleep" (Steve Goodman)
10. "I Got the Same Old Blues" (J. J. Cale)

== Personnel ==
- Steve Young - guitar, vocals
- Buddy Spicher - violin
- Buddy Emmons - steel guitar
- Lloyd Green - steel guitar
- Jerry Shook - guitar, harmonica
- Joseph Allen - bass
- Mike Leech - bass
- Charles Cochran - keyboards
- Kristin Wilkinson - viola
- Larry Byrom - guitar
- Jimmy Colvard - guitar
- David Kirby - guitar
- Dale Sellers - guitar
- Charlie McCoy - harmonica
- Mac Gayden - guitar
- Karl Himmel - drums
- Kenny Malone - drums
- Tracy Nelson - vocals
- Kim Young - vocals
