= George Girard =

American jazz musician

George Girard (October 7, 1930 – January 18, 1957) was a New Orleans jazz trumpeter. He was known for his great technical ability, playing in a style that combined traditional New Orleans Dixieland jazz with the big-band-style trumpet, and a member of the Basin Street Six.

Girard was born in Jefferson Parish, Louisiana. In highschool he studied music under Johnny Wiggs and became a professional musician immediately after graduating in 1946. He played and toured with the bands of Johnny Archer and Phil Zito before cofounding the band The Basin Street Six, made up mostly of friends he had grown up with, including clarinetist Pete Fountain. The band got a regular gig at L'Enfant's Restaurant in New Orleans, as well as regular television broadcasts over WWL. The band started receiving favorable national attention, but Girard was dissatisfied with it and broke up the band in 1954 to found his own band, George Girard & the New Orleans Five which included trombonist Bob Havens, drummer Paul Edwards, and bassist Bob Coquille. Girard landed a residency at the Famous Door in the French Quarter, recorded for several labels, and got a weekly broadcast on CBS's affiliated local radio station WWL. The broadcasts, from O'Dwyer's on Jefferson Highway, were recorded and made available through the AFRTS. Girard had ambitions to make a national name for himself (and according to many fellow musicians the musical ability to do so), but became ill and had to give up playing in 1956. Girard died from colon cancer in New Orleans on January 18, 1957.
