= List of Billboard Middle-Road Singles number ones of 1962 =

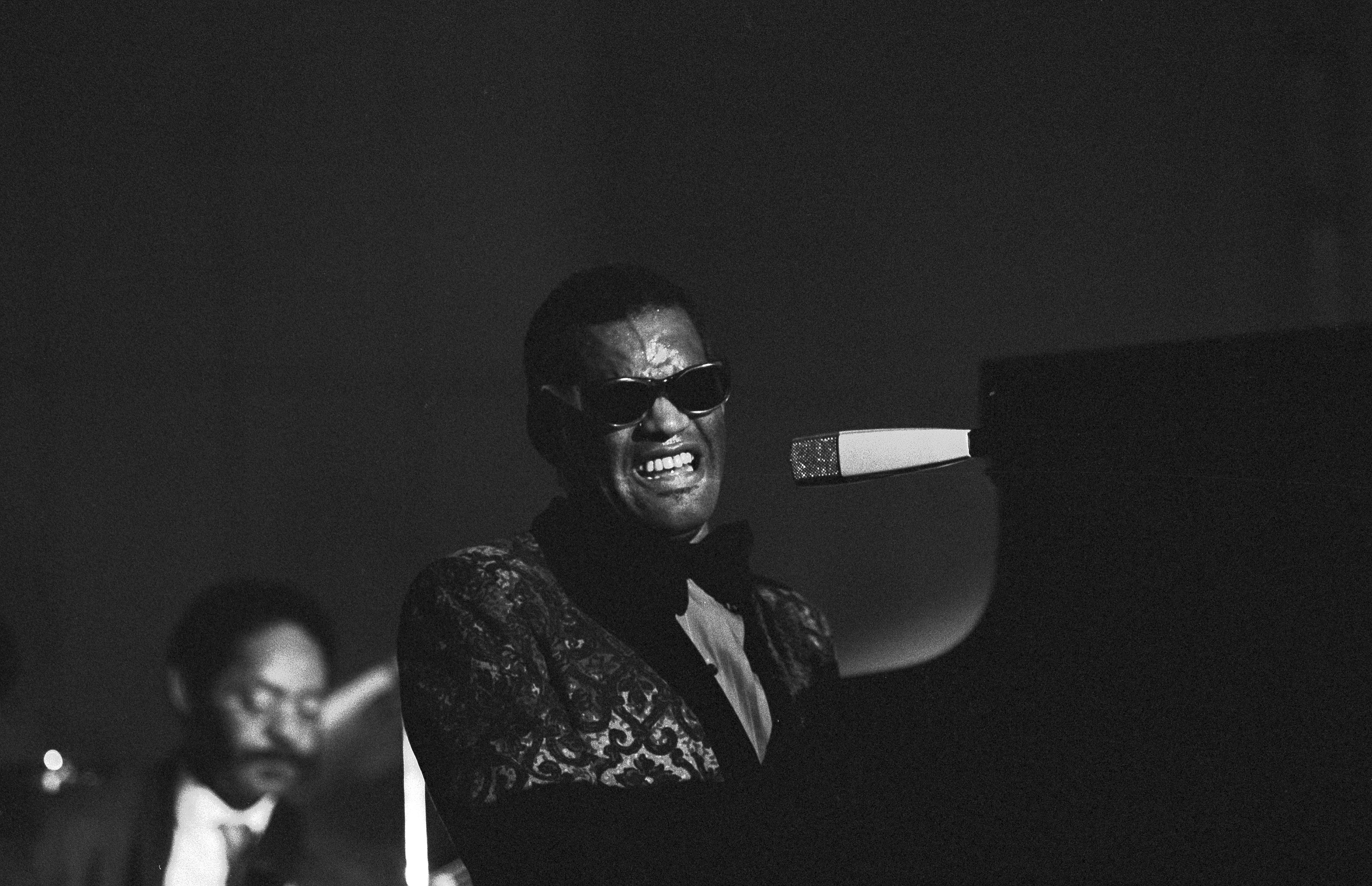
Ray Charles had two number ones in 1962, both from his album Modern Sounds in Country and Western Music.

In 1962, Billboard magazine published a chart ranking the top-performing songs in the United States which were considered to be "easy listening" or "middle of the road". The chart has undergone various name changes and since 1996 has been published under the title Adult Contemporary. Until 1965, the listing was compiled simply by extracting from Billboard's pop music chart, the Hot 100, those songs which were deemed by the magazine's staff to be of an appropriate style, and ranking them according to their positions on the Hot 100. In 1962, 15 different songs topped the chart in 52 issues of the magazine. The chart was published under the title Easy Listening through the issue of Billboard dated October 27, after which it was renamed Middle-Road Singles.

Ray Charles was the only artist with more than one number one in 1962. He reached the top with two tracks from his album Modern Sounds in Country and Western Music, which is considered to have been an innovative and highly influential record for its fusion of genres. "I Can't Stop Loving You" and "You Don't Know Me" spent a total of eight weeks in the top spot, the most for any artist. The former song also reached number one on the Hot 100, as well as the Hot R&B Sides chart. When Connie Francis reached number one with "Don't Break the Heart That Loves You" in March, she became the first act to top the Easy Listening chart twice, having spent a single week in the top spot in 1961 with "Together".

The longest unbroken run at number one on the Easy Listening/Middle-Road chart in 1962 was achieved by Acker Bilk, who spent seven consecutive weeks atop the listing with the instrumental "Stranger on the Shore". The track also reached number one on the Hot 100, the first time this feat had been achieved by a British artist. Bilk was one of two British band leaders associated with an early 1960s revival in the popularity of trad jazz to top the Easy Listening/Middle-Road chart in 1962; his number one came a month after Kenny Ball spent three weeks at number one with "Midnight in Moscow". Ball was one of a number of acts with an Easy Listening/Middle-Road number one in 1962 who never topped the Hot 100 during their careers, along with the Lettermen, Burl Ives, Frank Ifield and Gene Pitney. In addition to "I Can't Stop Loving You" and "Stranger on the Shore", three other songs which topped the Easy Listening/Middle-Road chart in 1962 also reached the peak position on the Hot 100. "The Stripper" by David Rose and "Roses Are Red (My Love)" by Bobby Vinton achieved the feat during July and August. The final Middle-Road number one of the year, "Go Away Little Girl" by Steve Lawrence, topped the Hot 100 early the following year.

== Chart history ==
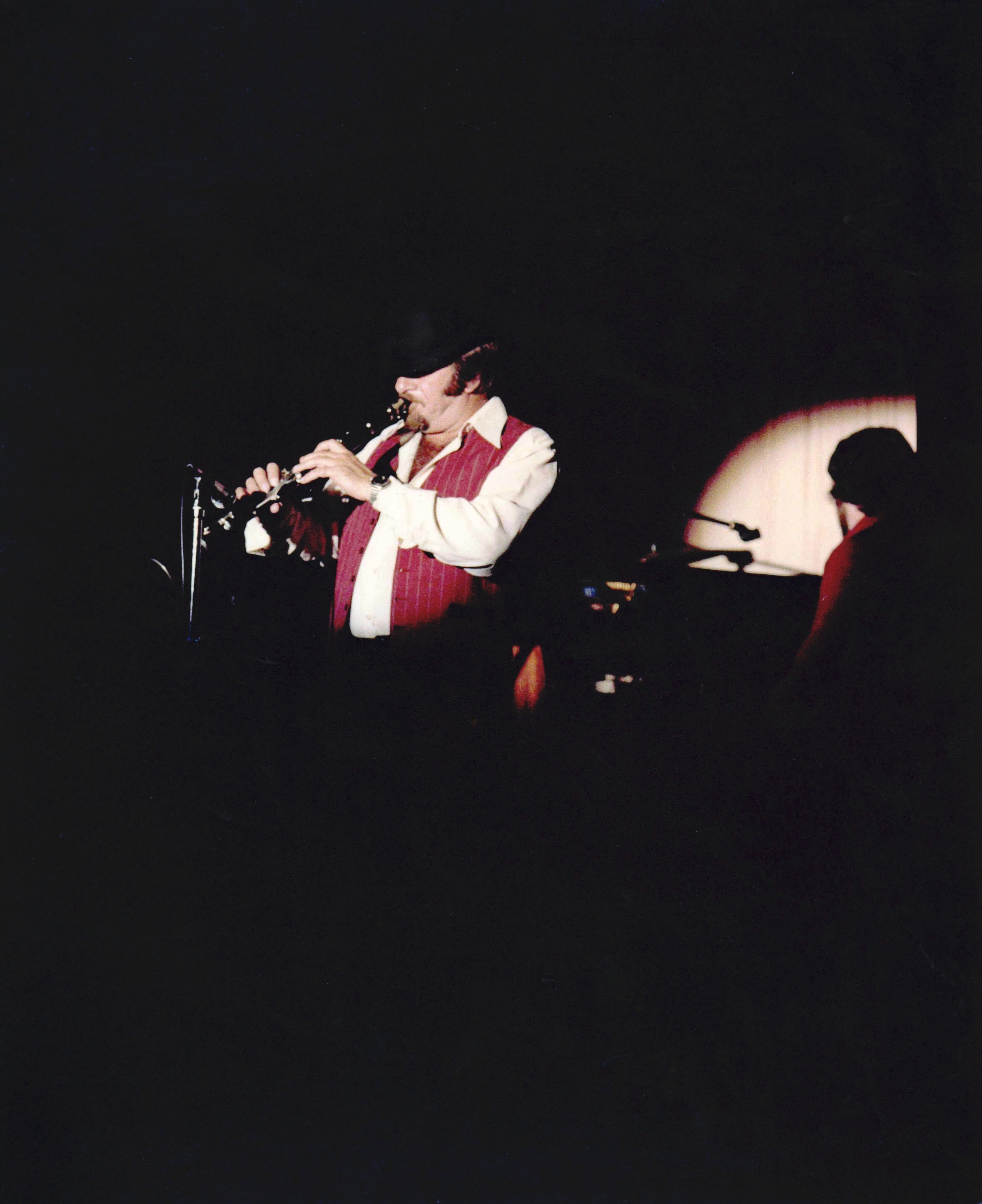
British clarinet player Acker Bilk reached number one with "Stranger on the Shore", which also topped the Hot 100.

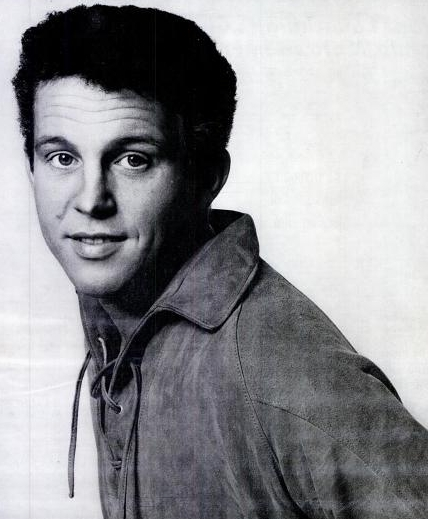
"Roses Are Red (My Love)" was a chart-topper for Bobby Vinton.

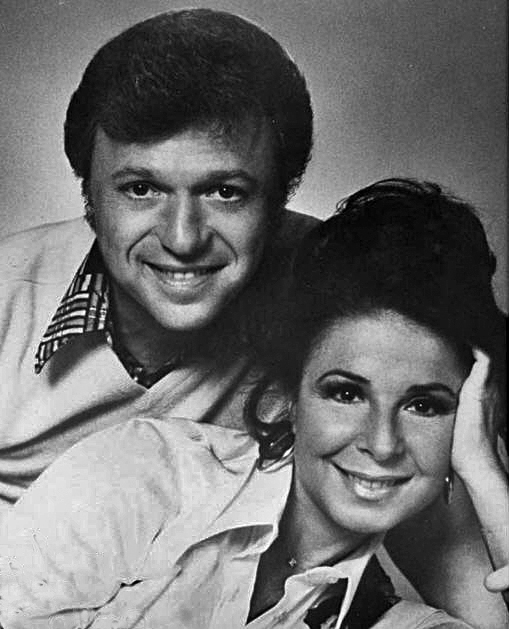
Steve Lawrence (pictured with Eydie Gormé) ended the year at number one.

Chart history
Issue date	Title	Artist(s)	Ref.
January 6	"When I Fall in Love"	The Lettermen	
January 13	"Can't Help Falling in Love"	Elvis Presley	
January 20	"Can't Help Falling in Love"	Elvis Presley	
January 27	"Can't Help Falling in Love"	Elvis Presley	
February 3	"Can't Help Falling in Love"	Elvis Presley	
February 10	"Can't Help Falling in Love"	Elvis Presley	
February 17	"Can't Help Falling in Love"	Elvis Presley	
February 24	"A Little Bitty Tear"	Burl Ives	
March 3	"Midnight in Moscow"	Kenny Ball and his Jazzmen	
March 10	"Midnight in Moscow"	Kenny Ball and his Jazzmen	
March 17	"Midnight in Moscow"	Kenny Ball and his Jazzmen	
March 24	"Don't Break the Heart That Loves You"	Connie Francis	
March 31	"Don't Break the Heart That Loves You"	Connie Francis	
April 7	"Don't Break the Heart That Loves You"	Connie Francis	
April 14	"Don't Break the Heart That Loves You"	Connie Francis	
April 21	"Stranger on the Shore"	Acker Bilk	
April 28	"Stranger on the Shore"	Acker Bilk	
May 5	"Stranger on the Shore"	Acker Bilk	
May 12	"Stranger on the Shore"	Acker Bilk	
May 19	"Stranger on the Shore"	Acker Bilk	
May 26	"Stranger on the Shore"	Acker Bilk	
June 2	"Stranger on the Shore"	Acker Bilk	
June 9	"I Can't Stop Loving You"	Ray Charles	
June 16	"I Can't Stop Loving You"	Ray Charles	
June 23	"I Can't Stop Loving You"	Ray Charles	
June 30	"I Can't Stop Loving You"	Ray Charles	
July 7	"The Stripper"	David Rose	
July 14	"The Stripper"	David Rose	
July 21	"I Can't Stop Loving You"	Ray Charles	
July 28	"Roses Are Red (My Love)"	Bobby Vinton	
August 4	"Roses Are Red (My Love)"	Bobby Vinton	
August 11	"Roses Are Red (My Love)"	Bobby Vinton	
August 18	"Roses Are Red (My Love)"	Bobby Vinton	
August 25	"You Don't Know Me"	Ray Charles	
September 1	"You Don't Know Me"	Ray Charles	
September 8	"You Don't Know Me"	Ray Charles	
September 15	"Ramblin' Rose"	Nat King Cole	
September 22	"Ramblin' Rose"	Nat King Cole	
September 29	"Ramblin' Rose"	Nat King Cole	
October 6	"Ramblin' Rose"	Nat King Cole	
October 13	"Ramblin' Rose"	Nat King Cole	
October 20	"I Remember You"	Frank Ifield	
October 27	"Only Love Can Break a Heart"	Gene Pitney	
November 3	"Only Love Can Break a Heart"	Gene Pitney	
November 10	"All Alone Am I"	Brenda Lee	
November 17	"All Alone Am I"	Brenda Lee	
November 24	"All Alone Am I"	Brenda Lee	
December 1	"All Alone Am I"	Brenda Lee	
December 8	"All Alone Am I"	Brenda Lee	
December 15	"Go Away Little Girl"	Steve Lawrence	
December 22	"Go Away Little Girl"	Steve Lawrence	
December 29	"Go Away Little Girl"	Steve Lawrence	

== See also ==
- 1962 in music
- List of artists who reached number one on the U.S. Adult Contemporary chart
