= Marvin Rainwater =

American country music-rockabilly singer-songwriter (1925–2013)

- Born: Marvin Karlton Rainwater; July 2, 1925; Wichita, Kansas, U.S.
- Died: September 17, 2013 (aged 88) Minneapolis, Minnesota, U.S.
- Genres: Country; pop; rockabilly
- Occupations: Singer; songwriter
- Years active: 1957–2013
- Labels: MGM; Warwick; United Artists; Warner Bros.; Sonet; Brave

Marvin Karlton Rainwater (July 2, 1925 – September 17, 2013) was an American country and rockabilly singer and songwriter who had several hits during the late 1950s, including the self-penned "Gonna Find Me a Bluebird" and "Whole Lotta Woman," which hit No. 1 on the UK singles chart. He was known for wearing Native American fashion-themed outfits on stage and claimed to have quarter-blood Cherokee ancestry.

== Biography ==
=== Early life and rise to fame ===
Rainwater was born on July 2, 1925 in Wichita, Kansas, to Stella (née Miller) and Cicero Percy Rainwater, and grew up during the Great Depression. He also lived in Alabama and Muskogee, Oklahoma. As a child he took classical piano lessons, which ended after he lost part of his right thumb to a work accident as a teenager. He originally trained to be a veterinarian, but after some time in the Navy during World War II took up the guitar.

He became fascinated with Roy Acuff and started playing and writing songs. With his brothers, he played concerts around Virginia. He sometimes wore a buckskin jacket and headband. Rising guitarist Roy Clark worked with Rainwater and together they cut a few demos for 4 Star Records. Pop singer Teresa Brewer turned his composition "I Gotta Go Get My Baby" into a big hit. Others were overdubbed and released on budget record labels.

Rainwater got his big break in the music business when he performed on Arthur Godfrey's programs. He won first place on Arthur Godfrey's Talent Scouts on May 9, 1955. He had a regular role on ABC-TV's Ozark Jubilee for several years in Springfield, Missouri beginning in 1955. He signed with MGM Records and recorded a series of songs for the label, including peppy numbers like "Hot and Cold". Such songs were showcases for Rainwater's voice, and his energy and versatility led him to record rockabilly.

=== Height of his career (late 1950s) ===
Rainwater was one of country's most noteworthy stars in the late 1950s, when his good looks and baritone voice made him popular. One of the first country songs he recorded was "Gonna Find Me a Bluebird", which he wrote. Released in 1957, the song became a big country-pop crossover hit, making Rainwater among the first country singers to appeal to a pop market. The song reached No. 3 on the country chart and 18 on the pop chart. It sold one million copies by 1957, and gave Rainwater his first gold record. During the song's success, Rainwater relocated to the New Jersey-New York area. "The Majesty of Love" (1957) was a duet with Connie Francis, which also sold over one million copies. His next single, "So You Think You Got Troubles", was a successful follow-up on the country charts, but not on the pop charts. His self-penned "Whole Lotta Woman" reached UK No. 1 for three weeks in April and May 1958. A second UK single, "I Dig You Baby", made No. 19 in June 1958. "Nothin' Needs Nothin' (Like I Need You)" missed the UK Top Thirty chart, but returned him to the US Country chart.

Rainwater performed and toured throughout the rest of the 1950s. In 1959, he added three more gold records: "My Love Is Real", "My Brand Of Blues" and "Half Breed" (A cover version of a John D. Loudermilk song,) all sold in excess of one million records. In 1959, Rainwater recorded another Loudermilk song, "The Pale Faced Indian". His original version went unnoticed, but later efforts by Don Fardon and Paul Revere & The Raiders under the title "Indian Reservation" were hits. Marvin recorded a number of songs with his little sister Patty Rainwater who was almost 12 years his junior. They recorded songs like "Down In The Cellar" as well as some of Patty's compositions like "Because I'm A Dreamer" and "Two Fools In Love".

His voice began to give out, and he developed calluses on his vocal cords. As a result, Rainwater and MGM Records parted ways in 1960. He went into brief retirement to rest his voice and then recorded sporadically for Warwick Records (United Kingdom), although without any hits. In the 1960s, he recorded for a series of record labels including United Artists, Warner Bros. and Sonet; and started his own record company called Brave Records.

=== Later life ===
In the 1970s, Rainwater developed throat cancer, from which he slowly recovered, and moved to Aitkin, Minnesota. He appeared occasionally at rockabilly festivals in Europe and was still loved by many fans.

Rainwater was the 73rd inductee into the Rockabilly Hall of Fame.

He died of heart failure on September 17, 2013, in Minneapolis. Marvin had children by his first wife, and three by his second. He was survived by his third wife.

== Legacy ==
Rainwater's song "Gamblin' Man" was covered by Mike Ness on his 1999 album, Under the Influences. "So You Think You've Got Troubles" was covered by Harry Nilsson, as evidenced on his 1966 Spotlight on Nilsson compilation album. "Gonna Find Me a Bluebird" was covered by Petula Clark in 1957 and by Steve Young on his 1969 album, Rock Salt & Nails. "Hot and Cold" was featured on Bob Dylan's radio show, Theme Time Radio Hour.

The British guitarist Hank Marvin derived his stage surname in honor of Marvin Rainwater.

== Discography ==
=== Singles ===
| Year | Single | Peak chart positions | | |
| Year | Single | US Country | US | UK |
|---|---|---|---|---|
| 1957 | "Gonna Find Me a Bluebird" | 3 | 18 | — |
| 1957 | "So You Think You've Got Troubles" | flip | — | — |
| 1957 | "The Majesty of Love" (with Connie Francis) | — | 93 | — |
| 1958 | "Whole Lotta Woman" | 15 | 60 | 1 |
| 1958 | "I Dig You Baby" | — | — | 19 |
| 1958 | "Nothin' Needs Nothin' (Like I Need You)" | 11 | — | — |
| 1959 | "Half-Breed" | 16 | 66 | — |
| 1961 | "I Can't Forget" | — | 119 | — |

=== Albums ===
- 1957 Songs By Marvin Rainwater (MGM E3534)
- 1958 Marvin Rainwater Sings With a Heart – With a Beat (MGM E3721) (1985:Bear Family BFX 15132)
- 1960 Sing for You (Audio Lab)
- 1962 Gonna Find Me A Bluebird (MGM E4046)
- 1963 Marvin Rainwater (Crown CST307)
- 1985 Rockin' Rollin' (Bear Family BFX15079) (MGM Whole Lotta Woman)
- 1970 Country's Favorite Singer (Mount Vernon MVM146)
- 1972 Gets Country Fever (Philips)
- 1981 Whatever Happened to Marvin Rainwater (Mark IV Records RR-42156)
