= Renegade Picker =

Studio album by Steve Young
- Released: June 1976
- Recorded: 1976
- Genre: Outlaw Country/Country rock
- Label: RCA
- Producer: Roy Dea

Steve Young chronology
Honky Tonk Man (1975)	Renegade Picker (1976)	No Place to Fall (1978)

Professional ratings
Review scores
Source	Rating
Allmusic	link

Renegade Picker is the fourth album by pioneer Outlaw country musician Steve Young. The album contains his song "Lonesome, On'ry and Mean", that became a hit for fellow outlaw Waylon Jennings.

== Track listing ==
All tracks composed by Steve Young; except where indicated

1. "Renegade Picker"
2. "I Can't Be Myself" (Merle Haggard)
3. "Old Memories"
4. "It's Not Supposed to Be That Way" (Willie Nelson)
5. "Tobacco Road" (J.D. Loudermilk)
6. "Light of My Life" (Weldon Allard, Johnny Hathcock)
7. "Lonesome, On'ry and Mean"
8. "All Her Lovers Want to Be the Hero"
9. "Broken Hearted People (Take Me to a Barroom)" (Guy Clark)
10. "Sweet Thing" (Walter Callahan)
11. "Home Sweet Home (Revisited)" (Rodney Crowell)

== Personnel ==
- Steve Young - guitar, vocals
- Johnny Gimble - mandolin, violin
- Buddy Emmons - steel guitar
- Jerry Shook - guitar, harmonica
- Mike Leech - bass
- Bobby Wood - keyboards
- Dale Sellars - guitar
- Terry McMillan (musician) - harmonica
- Mac Gayden - guitar
- Karl Himmel - drums
- Tracy Nelson - vocals
- Kim Young - vocals
- Kimberly Morrison-Cole - vocals
- Anita Ball - vocals

== Production ==
- Producer: Roy Dea
- Recording Engineer: unknown
- Art Direction: unknown
- Photography: unknown
- Liner notes: unknown
