= Reflections in Blue (Brenda Lee album) =

Studio album by Brenda Lee
- Released: October 16, 1967
- Recorded: June 1967
- Genres: Blues; pop
- Label: Decca
- Producers: Owen Bradley; Charles "Bud" Dant

Brenda Lee chronology
Coming on Strong (1966)	Reflections in Blue (1967)	For the First Time (1968)

Reflections in Blue is the eighteenth studio album by American singer Brenda Lee. It was released on October 16, 1967, by Decca Records. The album was considered a departure from Lee's previous studio projects in its musical style. Many of the tracks incorporated a Blues element and many were covers of previously recorded tracks. The album was met with positive reviews from publications.

== Background, recording and content ==
Brenda Lee began her recording career in 1956 at Decca Records at age 11. Her early material consisted of Rockabilly material, but as she matured, her music transitioned into pop, where Lee would have her greatest commercial success. She had top ten singles with songs like "All Alone Am I", "Dum Dum" and "I'm Sorry". By the mid-1960s, Lee's chart success waned, but she continued recording for Decca. One of her later sixties albums was Reflections in Blue. The album was recorded in June 1967 in sessions produced by Owen Bradley and Charles "Bud" Dant. It was Lee's first studio project, with Dant serving as a producer.

According to the album's liner notes, the project shows "a side of Brenda that many of her record fans may not be familiar with". The album was meant to showcase the ballad-influenced side of Lee's artistry as a way to show her maturity as an adult. Reflections in Blue consisted of ten tracks. The album was entirely a collection of cover songs. This included tracks like "Am I Blue?", "Can't Help Falling in Love", "Little Girl Blue" and "You'll Never Know".

== Release and critical reception ==
Professional ratings
Review scores
Source	Rating
Allmusic	4.5/5 stars

Reflections in Blue was released by Decca Records on October 16, 1967. It was originally offered as a vinyl LP, with five selections on either side of the record. It was Lee's eighteenth studio album in her career. Decades later, Reflections in Blue was re-released digitally to retailers such as Apple Music. The original LP was offered in both mono and stereo versions, as both options were popular by record buyers at the time.

The album was met with positive reviews from publications. Cashbox was quoted as saying the album was "poignant, plaintive, and provocative". Jason Ankeny of AllMusic gave the project four and a half (out of five) stars, highlighting Lee's musical shift in the album. He concluded by saying the album "captures the singer at her most moving, transcending the pop and country trappings of her biggest hits to evoke the nocturnal poignancy of Frank Sinatra's landmark sessions with arranger Nelson Riddle."

== Track listing ==
Side one
No.	Title	Length
1.	"Here's That Rainy Day"	3:27
2.	"You'll Never Know"	2:58
3.	"Baby, Won't You Please Come Home"	3:38
4.	"Can't Help Falling in Love"	2:30
5.	"I'll Only Miss Him When I Think of Him"	3:41

Side two
No.	Title	Length
1.	"Am I Blue"	2:22
2.	"If I Had You"	4:25
3.	"Close to You"	3:07
4.	"Little Girl Blue"	3:41
5.	"I Will Wait for You"	3:30

== Personnel ==
All credits are adapted from the liner notes of Reflections in Blue.

- Owen Bradley – Producer
- Hal Buksbaum – Cover photo
- Charles "Bud" Dant – Director, producer

== Release history ==
Region	Date	Format	Label	Ref.
Germany	October 16, 1967	Vinyl LP	Decca Records	
North America	October 16, 1967	Vinyl LP (Mono); Vinyl LP (Stereo)	Decca Records	
Australia	1968	Vinyl LP (Mono)	Festival Records	
Japan	1968	Vinyl LP (Stereo)	Decca Records	
United Kingdom	1968	Vinyl LP (Mono); Vinyl LP (Stereo)	MCA Records	
Japan	December 1, 1999	Compact disc	Decca Records; Universal	
Japan	January 17, 2007	Compact disc	Decca Records	
Japan	December 17, 2008	Compact disc	Decca Records; Universal	
North America	circa 2020	Music download; streaming	MCA Nashville	
