= Roses Are Red (My Love) =

Single by Bobby Vinton

from the album Roses Are Red
- B-side: "You and I"
- Released: April 6, 1962
- Recorded: February 16, 1962
- Genre: Traditional pop
- Length: 2:38
- Label: Epic
- Songwriters: Paul Evans, Al Byron
- Producer: Robert Morgan

Bobby Vinton singles chronology
"Roses Are Red (My Love)" (1962)	"I Love You the Way You Are" (1962)

"Roses Are Red (My Love)" is a popular song composed by Al Byron and Paul Evans. It was recorded by Bobby Vinton, backed by Robert Mersey and his Orchestra, in New York City in February 1962, and released in April 1962, and the song was his first hit.

== Bobby Vinton version ==
Bobby Vinton found the song in a reject pile at Epic Records. He first recorded it as an R&B number, but was allowed to re-record it in a slower more dramatic arrangement, with strings and a vocal choir (from Robert Mersey and his Orchestra) added.

The song was released in April 1962. It reached No. 1 in Australia, New Zealand, Norway, South Africa, and the United States, and was a major hit in many other countries as well. The song topped the Billboard Hot 100 singles chart on July 14, 1962, and remained there for four weeks. The single was also the first number-one hit for Epic Records.

Billboard ranked the record No. 4 in their year end ranking "Top 100 Singles of 1962" and No. 36 in their year end ranking of the top Rhythm and Blues records of 1962. The song was also ranked No. 17 on Cash Box's "Top 100 Chart Hits of 1962".

=== Chart performance ===
==== Weekly charts ====
Charts (1962)	Peak position
Australia (David Kent)	1
Australia (Music Maker)	2
Canada (CHUM Hit Parade)	1
Denmark	6
Flanders	5
Hong Kong	5
India (The Voice)	9
Ireland (Teenage Express)	3
Netherlands	3
New Zealand (Lever Hit Parade)	1
Norway (VG-lista)	1
South Africa	1
UK New Musical Express	13
UK Record Retailer	15
US Billboard Hot 100	1
US Billboard Easy Listening	1
US Billboard Hot R&B Sides	5
Wallonia	47
West Germany (Musikmarkt)	7

==== Year-end charts ====
Chart (1962)	Rank
South Africa	10
US Billboard Hot 100	4
US Billboard Easy Listening	3
US Billboard R&B	36
US Cash Box	17

== Certifications ==
Certifications for "Roses Are Red"
Region	Certification	Certified units/sales
United States (RIAA)	Gold	1,000,000^{^}
^{^} Shipments figures based on certification alone.

== Ronnie Carroll version ==
In the UK, a cover version by Northern Irish singer Ronnie Carroll reached No. 3 on the Record Retailer chart on August 8, 1962, the same week that the Bobby Vinton record peaked at No. 15. It peaked at No. 7 in the very first Irish Singles Chart published in September 1962.

=== Chart performance ===
Charts (1962)	Peak position
Ireland (IRMA)	7
UK (New Musical Express)	2
UK (Record Retailer)	3

== Other versions ==
In July 1962, David MacBeth released his version of the song as a single on Piccadilly Records.

The song was recorded by Jim Reeves in 1963 and released on the album Gentleman Jim, one of the last albums released while he was still alive.

Caterina Valente recorded the song in German, Rosen Sind Rot（1962). The single reached #7 in Germany.

In 1962, an answer song, entitled "Long as the Rose Is Red", was recorded by Florraine Darlin. The song spent seven weeks on the Billboard Hot 100, reaching No. 62, while reaching No. 15 on Billboard's Easy Listening chart. It was released by Epic Records (single #9529) and was produced by Robert Morgan.

== See also ==
- List of Hot 100 number-one singles of 1962 (U.S.)
- List of number-one adult contemporary singles of 1962 (U.S.)
- VG-lista 1962
- List of number-one singles in Australia during the 1960s
- List of number-one singles in 1962 (New Zealand)
