= Jack Sperling =

American jazz drummer (1922–2004)

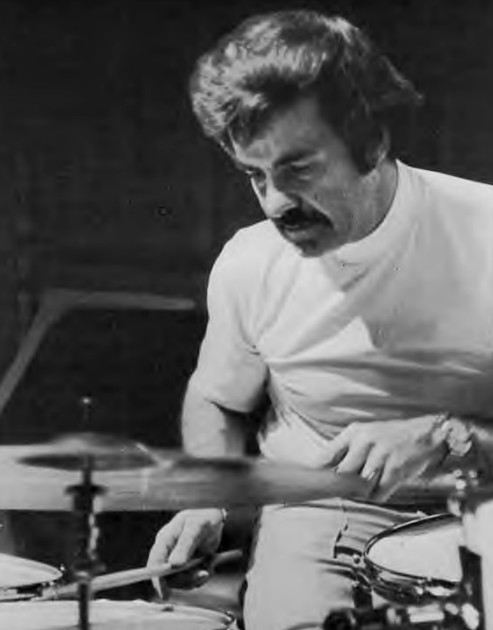
- Sperling in a 1972 DownBeat advertisement

Background information
- Born: August 17, 1922
- Died: February 26, 2004 (aged 81)
- Genres: Jazz
- Instrument: Drums

Jack Sperling (August 17, 1922 – February 26, 2004) was an American jazz drummer who performed as a sideman in big bands and as a studio musician for pop and jazz acts, movies, and television.

== Career ==
In 1941 he played with trumpeter Bunny Berigan. After World War II, he and Henry Mancini joined the Glenn Miller band when it was led by Tex Beneke. Sperling drew attention with his performance on the song St. Louis Blues (1948). He then joined Les Brown and His Band of Renown, which played regularly for the Bob Hope radio program. Sperling and other members of Brown's band joined Dave Pell's octet in 1953. He recorded with octet on Plays Irving Berlin (1953) and on The Original Reunion of the Glenn Miller Orchestra (1954). From 1954–57, he was a member of Bob Crosby's Bobcats. During the rest of his career, he worked in bands led by Charlie Barnet, Page Cavanaugh, Pete Fountain, and Benny Goodman.

Sperling was among the studio musicians who accompanied Henry Mancini on the television show Peter Gunn. He recorded with Mancini on the film soundtracks Charade (1963) and Days of Wine and Roses (1962). Sperling was the featured solo drummer on the theme song for the TV show Hogan's Heroes. From 1959–1972, he was under contract with the NBC Orchestra. This meant working for The Tonight Show Band, Rowan & Martin's Laugh-In, and TV variety shows hosted by Bob Hope, Dean Martin, and Andy Williams.

In the music world, he recorded with Rosemary Clooney, Bobby Darin, Sammy Davis Jr., Doris Day, Ella Fitzgerald, The Four Freshmen, Lena Horne, Peggy Lee, Elvis Presley, Frank Sinatra, and Mel Tormé.

== Discography ==
With Bunny Berigan

- Bunny Berigan Orchestra 1938–1942 (RCA)
- Sophisticated Swing (1947)

With Tex Beneke and the Glenn Miller Orchestra

- St. Louise Blues March (RCA, 1948)
- Cherokee Canyon (RCA Victor, 1948)
- Palladium Patrol (1970)
- Dancers Delight (1996)
- Live at the Edgewater (2000)
- Tex Beneke & His Orchestra 1946–1949
- In Glenn Millers' Footsteps: Blues Serenades & Marches (2001)
- Five Minutes More: A Tribute (2001)
- It's Magic 1947–48 (2002)
- Memories (2005)
- Gary Steven's Sings (2005)
- Midnight Serenade (2006)
- Beyond the Sea (2007)

With Les Brown

- Connee Boswell and Les Brown (1950) Short Film (15 min.)
- Connee Boswell I Don't Know (1950)
- Connie Boswell Martha (1950)
- Over the Rainbow (1951)
- My Heart Belongs to Daddy (Coral, 1952)
- Back in Your Own Backyard (Coral, 1952)
- Palladium Concert (1953)
- Live at the Hollywood Palladium (1954)
- Les Brown & His Orchestra, Vol. 2 (1949)
- Blue Moon, Vol. 1 Blue Moon
- Blue Skies, Vol. 2 Blue Moon
- Perdido, Vol. 3 Blue Moon
- Radio Days Live(2001)
- Les Brown & His Band Renown (Coral, 1957)
- Swinging Song Book (Coral, 1957)
- Live at Elitch Gardens 1959 (1959)
- Bandland/ Revolution In Sound (1960)
- Digital Swing (1986)
- Anything Goes (1994)
- America Swings (1995)
- Sentimental Thing (with Bing Crosby & Billy Eckstine) (2003)
- No Name Bop
- A Good Man Is Hard to Find
- Thank You for Your Fine Attention
- The Les Brown All-Stars (2006)

With Doris Day

- From This Moment On (Columbia, 1950)
- It's Magic (2002)

With The Modernaires

- St. Louise Blues March (1948) RCA Victor
- Like Swung (1959) Mercury

With Dave Pell

- Plays Irving Berlin (1953) Capitol
- Burke and Van Heusen (1953) Capitol
- I Had the Craziest Dream (1955) Capitol
- Say It with Music (2004)
- Jazz for Dancing and Listening

With Tom Talbert Jazz Orchestra

- The Warm Cafe (1955) (1991)
- Duke's Domain (1955) (1993)

With Scatman Crothers

- Oh, Yeah! (Tops, 1956)
- Rock and Roll with Scat Man (1956)

With John Towner

- Jazz Beginnings-Fresh Sound (1956)

With Rosemary Clooney

- Jazz Singer (1952)
- Many a Wonderful Moment (RCA, 1958)

With Ella Fitzgerald

- Get Happy! (1957)
- The Secret of Christmas (1959)
- The Christmas Song (1959)

With Pete Fountain

- Pete Fountain's New Orleans (Coral, 1959)
- Pete Fountain Day (Coral, 1960)
- Pete Fountain Salutes The Great Clarinetists (Coral, 1960)
- Pete Fountain's French Quarter (Coral, 1961)
- Live in Santa Monica (1961)
- Jack Sperling and his Fascinatin' Rhythm (Coral, 1961)
- Plenty of Pete (Coral, 1963)
- Mr. New Orleans (MCA, 1963)

With Henry Mancini

- Fallout/Music from Peter Gunn (RCA, 1959)
- The Blues and the Beat (RCA, 1960)
- Cheers (RCA, 1962)
- Uniquely Mancini (RCA, 1963)
- Mancini '67 (The Big Band Sound of Henry Mancini) (RCA, 1967)
- Mancini Salutes Sousa (RCA, 1972)
- Martinis with Mancini (RCA, 1998)

With Frank Sinatra

- Guys and Dolls (Reprise, 1963)
- We Open in Venice (1963)

With Dean Martin

- Bianca (Reprise, 1963)
- If This Isn't Love (Reprise, 1963)
- Everybody Loves Somebody Sometime (Capitol, 1964)

With Bobby Darin

- From Hello Dolly to Goodbye Charlie (Capitol, 1964)
- Broadway Bag (Atlantic, 1965)
- Magic of Bobby Darin (Atlantic, 1965)
- The Shadow of Your Smile (Atlantic, 1965)
- "Breaking Point"/"Silver Dollar" (Atlantic, 1966) (singles)
- Swingin' the Standards (Atlantic, 1999)

With Bud Freedman

- Tender Loving World (1973)
- When It's Time to Tell (1973)
- That's Love (1973)
- How Could I Go On (1973)
- Sleepy Baby (1973)

With Abe Most

- Abe Most Live! (1994)
- I Love Yo Much Too Much (2007)

With Paul Cacia

- Paul & His New Age Jazz Orchestra (2003)
- Cacia: Portrait (2003)

With others

- Elvis Presley Elvis 1968
- Dinah Washington The Definitive Dianah Washington 1943–1962
- Teresa Brewer Music, Music, Music (1950)
- Billy May Glenn Miller Orchestra Reunion (1954)
- Walter Gross Walter Gross Plays His Own Great Songs (1956)
- George Van Eps Mellow Guitar (1956)
- Freddie Slack Boogie-Woogie on the 88 (1956)
- Jo Stafford & Paul Weston The Original Piano Artistry of Jonathan Edwards, Vocals by Darlene Edwards (1957)
- The Kirby Stone Four Man I Flipped (1957)
- The Four Freshmen The Four Freshmen and 5 Guitars (Capitol, 1957)
- Harry Belafonte Harry Belafonte Sings the Blues (RCA, 1958)
- Sheb Wooley The Purple People Eater (RCA, 1958)
- The Kingston Trio Here We Go Again (Capitol, 1959)
- Chet Atkins Chet Atkins in Hollywood (RCA, 1959)
- Ralph Marterie and the All Star Men Big Band Man (Mercury, 1959)
- Paul Smith Saratoga (1959)
- Benny Goodman King of Swing 1958–1967 (1960, 1995)
- Page Cavanaugh Quartet (1960)
- Page Cavanaugh Septet (1961)
- Sue Raney Breathless
- Wynona Carr Wild Wonderful Wynona (1962)
- James Brown Mr. James Brown Getting Down to It (1966)
- Bonanza A Ponderosa Party (1962–1966)
- Godfrey Hirsch Happiness is Godfrey Hirsch and His Vibes(1966)
- Bob Crosby Mardi Gras Parade (1966)
- Charlie Barnet Charlie Barnet Big Band: 1967 (1966)
- Carmen McRae Portrait of Carmen (1967)
- Bob Florence Pet Project (1967)
- John Sheridan Stairway to Paradise (1975)
- Peanuts Hucko Peanuts Hucko with His Pied Piper Quintet (1979)
- Don Fagerquist Portrait of a Great Jazz Artist

== Soundtracks ==
- The Five Pennies (Paramount, 1959)
- Peter Gunn (MGM, 1959)
- Mr. Lucky (CBS, 1959)
- Rawhide (Paramount, 1959)
- Days of Wine and Roses (Warner Bros., 1962)
- Hatari (Paramount, 1962)
- Bonanza (Paramount, 1962)
- Charade (Universal, 1963)
- Bewitched(Screen Gems, 1964)
- Hogan's Heroes (Paramount, 1965)
- Elvis (1968)
- It Was a Short Summer, Charlie Brown (1969)

== Early musical short films ==
- Les Brown (1948)
- Les Brown and His Band of Renown (1949)
- Art Lund-Tex Beneke-Les Brown (1948)
- Connee Boswell and Les Brown's Orchestra (1950)
- Crazy Frolic (1953)
- Dance Demons (1957)
- Rockabilly Baby (1957)
- Snarder Telescriptions: The Big Bands Vol. 2 (1958)

== Television ==
- Bob Hope Show (1949–1954) NBC Radio
- Colgate Comedy Hour (1952) NBC
- The Bob Crosby Show (1954–57) CBS
- Peter Gunn (1958–1961) MGM
- Mr. Lucky (1959–1960) CBS
- Rawhide (1959) Paramount
- The Tonight Show Starring Johnny Carson NBC
- Bob Hope Show (1959–1962) NBC
- The Steve Allen Show (1959) NBC
- Bobby Darin and Friends (1961) NBC
- Andy Williams Show (1962–1967) NBC
- Bonanza (1962–1966) Paramount
- Star Time: The Swingin' Singin' Years (1960) NBC
- Bewitched (1964) ABC
- Bob Hope Thanksgiving Show (1964) NBC
- Hogan's Heroes (1965) Paramount
- Dean Martin Show (1965–1972) NBC
- Dean Martin Summer Show (1966) NBC
- Movin' With Nancy (1967) NBC
- Rowan & Martin's Laugh-In(1968–1972) NBC
- Rowan & Martin at the Movies (1968) NBC
- Dean Martin and The Golddigger's (1968) NBC
- Elvis (NBC-TV Special) (1968) NBC
- It Was a Short Summer, Charlie Brown (1969) CBS
