= Stories Round the Horseshoe Bend =

Stories Round the Horseshoe Bend is a 2007 live album by American musician Steve Young. The album was recorded at Pioneer Pavilion in Youngstown, Ohio by Tom Sailor.

== Track listing ==
1. "Ragtime Blue Guitar"
2. "Little Birdie"
3. "Coal Tattoo"
4. "White Trash Song"
5. "Tobacco Road"
6. "Seven Bridges Road"
7. "Silverlake"
8. "Lonesome, On'ry & Mean"
9. "Ballad of William Sycamore"
10. "Peyote Chant"
11. "Coyote"
12. "Useful Girl"
13. "One Woman Man"
14. "Hoboin'"
15. "Useful Girl"
