= Bye Bye Blues (album) =

Studio album by Brenda Lee
- Released: March 14, 1966
- Recorded: August 1965–January 1966
- Studios: Columbia, Nashville, Tennessee
- Genre: Nashville Sound
- Label: Decca
- Producer: Owen Bradley

Brenda Lee chronology
Too Many Rivers (1965)	Bye Bye Blues (1966)	10 Golden Years (1966)

Singles from Bye Bye Blues
- 1. "Rusty Bells" Released: September 1965

Bye Bye Blues is the sixteenth studio album by American singer Brenda Lee. It was released on March 14, 1966, via Decca Records. The project consisted of 12 tracks, most of which were cover tunes recorded originally by other artists. A new song was also included called "Rusty Bells", which was the album's only single. The song made the US top 40 and the US adult contemporary top ten in 1965.

== Background, recording and content ==
Brenda Lee rose to commercial recording stardom recording first as a Rockabilly artist and graduating to pop music. During the 1960s, she had a string of top ten singles like "Sweet Nothin's", "Fool No. 1", "Dum Dum" and chart toppers like "I'm Sorry". Lee's singles no longer made the US top ten following 1963, but continued reaching the top 20 while also being commercially successful in other countries.

Among Lee's studio albums released during this period was Bye Bye Blues. The album was recorded in sessions held between August 1965 and January 1966 at the Columbia Studio in Nashville, Tennessee. The album was produced by Owen Bradley. Bye Bye Blues consisted of 12 tracks. According to the liner notes, the album was prepared with "some arrangements" but left "plenty of moving around". Lee used the arrangements as a foundation to make decisions about how she wanted to record the material. The album mostly featured covers of songs first recorded by other artists.

== Release, chart performance, reception and singles ==
Bye Bye Blues was released by Decca Records on March 14, 1966. It accounted for being Lee's sixteenth studio album in her career. It was distributed as a vinyl LP, featuring six tracks on either side of the record. The same year, it was released in Japan under the title A Taste of Honey. In 1968, it was reissued by MCA Records under the title The Good Life. In the British newspaper Record Mirror, the disc was highlighted as being "a sensational new album" and also being called "one of her best".

Bye Bye Blues made the US Billboard 200 record chart, peaking at number 94 in 1966. Up to that point, it was Lee's lowest-charting album on the Billboard 200. It also became her fourth album to make the UK Albums Chart, rising to the number 21 position. The album's only single was the song "Rusty Bells", which was released in September 1965. It made the top 40 of the US Billboard Hot 100, peaking at the number 33 position in late 1965. It also made the top ten of the US adult contemporary chart, peaking at number three around the same time.

== Track listing ==
Side one
No.	Title	Writer(s)	Length
1.	"A Taste of Honey"	Bobby Scott; Ric Marlow	2:49
2.	"The Good Life"	Sacha Distel; Jack Reardon	2:59
3.	"Flowers on the Wall"	Lew DeWitt	2:14
4.	"The Shadow of Your Smile" (love theme from The Sandpiper)	Paul Francis Webster	2:22
5.	"Remember When (We Made These Memories)"	Bert Kaempfert; Charles Singleton; Eddie Snyder	2:10
6.	"Softly, as I Leave You"	Tony De Vita; Giorgio Calabrese; Hal Shaper	2:40

Side two
No.	Title	Writer(s)	Length
1.	"Bye Bye Blues"	Fred Hamm; Dave Bennett; Bert Lown; Chauncey Gray	2:17
2.	"Make the World Go Away"	Hank Cochran	2:30
3.	"September in the Rain"	Al Dubin; Harry Warren	2:30
4.	"Rusty Bells"	Eddie Snyder; Richard Ahlert	2:26
5.	"What a Diff'rence a Day Made"	María Grever; Stanley Adams	2:23
6.	"Yesterday"	Lennon–McCartney	3:15

== Personnel ==
All credits are adapted from the liner notes of Bye Bye Blues.

- Owen Bradley – Producer
- Bill McElhiney – Arrangements
- Cam Mullins – Arrangements

== Chart performance ==
Chart (1966)	Peak position
UK Albums (Official Charts)	21
US Billboard 200	94

== Release history ==
Region	Date	Format	Label	Ref.
Australia	March 14, 1966	Vinyl LP (Mono)	Festival Records	
Japan	March 14, 1966	Vinyl LP (Stereo)	Decca Records	
Mexico	March 14, 1966	Vinyl LP (Stereo)	Decca Records; Orfeón	
North America	March 14, 1966	Vinyl LP (Mono); Vinyl LP (Stereo)	Decca Records	
Spain	March 14, 1966	Vinyl LP (Mono)	Decca Records	
United Kingdom	March 14, 1966	Vinyl LP (Mono); Vinyl LP (Stereo)	Brunswick Records	
Venezuela	March 14, 1966	Vinyl LP (Mono)	Decca Records	
United Kingdom	1968	Vinyl LP (Mono); Vinyl LP (Stereo)	MCA Records	
