= List of number-one singles in 1962 (New Zealand) =

This is a list of Number 1 hit singles in 1962 in New Zealand from the Lever Hit Parade.

== Chart ==
Week	Title	Artist
4 January 1962	"Tower Of Strength"	Gene McDaniels
11 January 1962	"Runaround Sue"	Dion
18 January 1962	"Runaround Sue"	Dion
25 January 1962	"The Twist"	Chubby Checker
1 February 1962	"The Twist"	Chubby Checker
8 February 1962	"Peppermint Twist"	Joey Dee
15 February 1962	"Peppermint Twist"	Joey Dee
22 February 1962	"Peppermint Twist"	Joey Dee
1 March 1962	"Peppermint Twist"	Joey Dee
8 March 1962	"The Lion Sleeps Tonight"	The Tokens
15 March 1962	"The Lion Sleeps Tonight"	The Tokens
22 March 1962	"Duke of Earl"	Gene Chandler
29 March 1962	"Duke of Earl"	Gene Chandler
5 April 1962	"Hey! Baby"	Bruce Channel
12 April 1962	"Hey! Baby"	Bruce Channel
19 April 1962	"Stranger on the Shore"	Acker Bilk
26 April 1962	"Don't Break the Heart That Loves You"	Connie Francis
3 May 1962	"Good Luck Charm"	Elvis Presley
10 May 1962	"Good Luck Charm"	Elvis Presley
17 May 1962	"Good Luck Charm"	Elvis Presley
24 May 1962	"Johnny Angel"	Shelley Fabares
31 May 1962	"Soldier Boy"	The Shirelles
7 June 1962	"Soldier Boy"	The Shirelles
14 June 1962	"Soldier Boy"	The Shirelles
21 June 1962	"Wonderful Land"	The Shadows
28 June 1962	"I Can't Stop Loving You"	Ray Charles
5 July 1962	"I Can't Stop Loving You"	Ray Charles
12 July 1962	"I Can't Stop Loving You"	Ray Charles
19 July 1962	"The Young Ones"	Cliff Richard
26 July 1962	"The Young Ones"	Cliff Richard
2 August 1962	"The Stripper"	David Rose
9 August 1962	"Roses Are Red (My Love)"	Bobby Vinton
16 August 1962	"Roses Are Red (My Love)"	Bobby Vinton
23 August 1962	"Breaking Up Is Hard to Do"	Neil Sedaka
30 August 1962	"Breaking Up Is Hard to Do"	Neil Sedaka
6 September 1962	"I Remember You"	Frank Ifield
13 September 1962	"I Remember You"	Frank Ifield
20 September 1962	"She's Not You"	Elvis Presley
27 September 1962	"The Locomotion"	Little Eva
4 October 1962	"Sherry"	The Four Seasons
11 October 1962	"Sherry"	The Four Seasons
18 October 1962	"Sherry"	The Four Seasons
25 October 1962	"Sherry"	The Four Seasons
1 November 1962	"Sherry"	The Four Seasons
8 November 1962	"Monster Mash"	Bobby Pickett and the Crypt Kickers
15 November 1962	"Monster Mash"	Bobby Pickett and the Crypt Kickers
22 November 1962	"Telstar"	The Tornados
29 November 1962	"Telstar"	The Tornados
6 December 1962	"He's a Rebel"	The Crystals
13 December 1962	"He's a Rebel"	The Crystals
20 December 1962	"He's a Rebel"	The Crystals
27 December 1962	"He's a Rebel"	The Crystals
