= Honky Tonk Man (album) =

- The 1994 CD reissue used different artwork

Studio album by Steve Young
- Released: August 1975
- Recorded: 1975
- Genre: Outlaw Country, Progressive country
- Length: 43:04
- Label: Mountain Railroad Records
- Producer: Stephen Powers

Steve Young chronology
Seven Bridges Road (1972)	Honky Tonk Man (1975)	Renegade Picker (1976)

Professional ratings
Review scores
Source	Rating
AllMusic	4/5 stars

Honky Tonk Man is the third album by pioneer outlaw country musician Steve Young.

== Track listing ==
All tracks composed by Steve Young; except where indicated

1. "Honky Tonk Man" (Johnny Horton, Howard Hausey, Tilman Franks) - 2:23
2. "Brain Cloudy Blues" (Bob Wills, Tommy Duncan) - 4:48
3. "Rock Salt & Nails" (Utah Phillips) - 3:58
4. "Rockin' Chair Money" (Bill Carlisle, Lonnie Glosson) - 2:37
5. "Ramblin' Man" (Hank Williams) - 3:44
6. "The Night They Drove Old Dixie Down" (Robbie Robertson) - 5:15
7. "Traveling Kind" - 3:01
8. "Sally Goodin'" (Traditional) - 2:12
9. "Alabama Highway" - 4:57
10. "Vision of a Child" - 3:30
11. "We've Been Together on This Earth Before" - 3:13
12. "The White Trash Song" - 3:46

== Personnel ==
- Steve Young - guitar, vocals
- Bill Peterson - bass
- Eric Gravatt - drums & vocals
- Cal Hand - steel guitar, dobro, vocals
- Mark Henley - harmonica
- Stephen Powers - vocals
- Betsy Kaske - vocals

== Production ==
- Producer: Stephen Powers
- Recording Engineer: Paul Martinson
