= Gonna Find Me a Bluebird =

Single by Marvin Rainwater

from the album Songs by Marvin Rainwater
- B-side: "So You Think You've Got Troubles"
- Released: January 1957
- Genre: Country
- Length: 2:33
- Label: MGM
- Songwriter: Marvin Rainwater

Marvin Rainwater singles chronology
| "What Am I Supposed to Do" (1956) | "Gonna Find Me a Bluebird" (1957) | "My Brand of Blues" (1957) |

"Gonna Find Me a Bluebird" is a song written and performed by Marvin Rainwater. It reached number three on the U.S. country chart and number 18 on the U.S. pop chart in 1957. The song was featured on his 1957 album, Songs by Marvin Rainwater. It was his first million-seller single.

== Other charting versions ==
- Eddy Arnold released a version of the song as a single in 1957 which reached number 12 on the U.S. country chart and number 51 on the U.S. pop chart.

== Other versions ==
- Petula Clark released a version of the song as the B-side to her 1957 single "With All My Heart".
- Russ Hamilton released a version of the song as a single in 1960, but it did not chart.
- Brenda Lee released a version of the song as the B-side to her 1961 single "If You Love Me". It was featured on her 1962 album Brenda, That's All.
- Billy Walker released a version of the song on his 1961 album Everybody's Hits But Mine.
- Porter Wagoner and Skeeter Davis released a version of the song on their 1963 EP Western Jubilee III.
- Reg Lindsay released a version of the song on his 1967 EP Gonna Find Me a Bluebird.
- Hank Snow released a version of the song on his 1965 album Hank Snow Sings Your Favorite Country Hits.
- Pat Boone released a version of the song as a single in 1968, but it did not chart.
- Webb Pierce released a version of the song on his 1968 album Fool, Fool, Fool.
- Steve Young released a version of the song on his 1969 album Rock Salt & Nails.
- Kitty Wells released a version of the song as the B-side to her 1970 single "I Don't See What I Saw".
- Danny Davis & The Nashville Brass released a version of the song on their 1974 album Latest and Greatest.
- Frank Ifield released a version of the song on his 1991 album The Best of Frank Ifield.
- Slim Whitman released a version of the song on his 1992 album Golden Country Hits.
