= Sincerely (Brenda Lee album) =

Studio album by Brenda Lee
- Released: February 12, 1962
- Genre: Pop
- Label: Decca
- Producer: Owen Bradley

Brenda Lee chronology
All the Way (1961)	Sincerely (1962)	Brenda, That's All (1962)

Sincerely is the sixth studio album by American singer, Brenda Lee. It was released by Decca Records on February 17, 1962 and was her sixth studio collection. In an effort to target a more adult audience, Sincerely was a collection of 12 American standards. The album received mixed reviews from critics, with some writers believing Lee's adult transition was not working. Sincerely reached the top 30 on the US albums chart after its release.

== Background ==
Brenda Lee found success as a teenager in the rock and roll field and began recording pop songs in the 1960s. She had a series of major hit singles, including "Sweet Nothin's" and "I'm Sorry". In her autobiography, Lee recalled that her label, manager and others believed her audience had become too closely associated with teens. Lee then explained that several steps were taken to market her career towards adult audiences when she was 17, and one of the first transitions into this field included making an album entirely of American standards. It would be titled Sincerely and was among additional albums her label issued in 1962. Sincerely gave credit in its liner notes to Lee's producer, Owen Bradley and its arranger, Bill McElhiney. The studio collection consisted of 12 tracks in total and was mostly a collection of slow-tempo ballads. An exception was the uptempo track "Fools Rush In". "Hold Me" would notably be recorded by P. J. Proby in 1964 and become a commercial success for him.

== Release, critical reception, chart performance and singles ==
Professional ratings
Review scores
Source	Rating
AllMusic	3/5 stars

Sincerely was released by Decca Records on February 12, 1962 and was her sixth studio album. It was originally distributed in two vinyl LP formats: monaural or stereo. The collection was met with mixed reviews. Billboard called it "a powerful wax" that was "well planned to catch both the kids and adults", while Cash Box called it "top notch entertainment" they felt would also cross generational lines. Meanwhile Life wrote that despite her attempts to sing standards, "she barely gets by". AllMusic's Richie Unterberger gave the album three out of five stars and disliked its lack of rock tunes. He also wrote, "It's one of the more forgettable albums from her prime, of value only to big fans and completists.".

Sincerely spent 23 weeks on the US Billboard 200 all-genre survey, reaching a peak of 29 in 1962. It was the fifth album in Lee's career to make the chart and lowest-peaking album on the chart up to that point. No official radio singles were included on Sincerely, however, a series of promotional singles were issued between 1961 and 1962: "You Always Hurt the One You Love", "You Got Me Crying Again", "Send Me Some Lovin'", "Fools Rush In" and "Hold Me".

== Track listing ==
Side one
No.	Title	Writer(s)	Length
1.	"You Always Hurt the One You Love"	Allan Roberts; Doris Fisher	2:41
2.	"Lazy River"	Hoagy Carmichael; Sidney Arodin	2:15
3.	"You've Got My Crying Again"	Isham Jones; Charles Newman	2:36
4.	"It's the Talk of the Town"	Jerry Livingston; Marty Symes; Al J. Neiburg	3:10
5.	"Send Me Some Lovin'"	Leo Price; John Marascalco	2:50
6.	"How Deep Is the Ocean (How High Is the Sky)"	Irving Berlin	3:04

Side two
No.	Title	Writer(s)	Length
1.	"I'll Always Be In Love With You"	Herman Ruby; Bud Green; Sam H. Stept	2:30
2.	"I Miss You So"	Jimmie Henderson; Bertha Scott; Sid Robin	2:51
3.	"Fools Rush In (Where Angels Fear to Tread)"	Johnny Mercer; Rube Bloom	2:35
4.	"Only You (And You Alone)"	Buck Ram, Andie Rand	2:53
5.	"Hold Me"	Jack Little; David Oppenheim; Ira Schuster	2:34
6.	"I'll Be Seeing You"	Irving Kahal; Sammy Fain	2:35

== Personnel ==
All credits are adapted from the liner notes of Sincerely.

- Owen Bradley – Director/producer
- Bill McElhiney – Arrangements

== Chart performance ==
Chart (1962)	Peak position
US Billboard 200	29

== Release history ==
Release history and formats for Sincerely, Brenda Lee
Region	Date	Format	Label	Ref.
Various	February 12, 1962	LP mono; LP stereo	Brunswick; Decca; Festival	
Various	Circa 2020	Music download; streaming	MCA Nashville	
