= Basin Street Six =

American musical group

The Basin Street Six was a Dixieland sextet founded in 1950 in New Orleans that had some famous members, including George Girard, Roy Zimmerman, Pete Fountain, Joe Rotis and Charlie Duke among others. They recorded for various record companies, including Mercury Records and 504 Records.

The band performed during the late 1970s, 80s, and 90s at the helm of famed New Orleans clarinetist Chuck Credo Jr., who toured with the band through Europe, Singapore, and Asia. Credo's Basin Street Six recorded one official release "Jazzin' From New Orleans To Nashville" in 1984 to coincide with the New Orleans World's Fair. The album is still in print and available through WCIII Records. The Basin Street Six still performs in New Orleans and the surrounding region for special events. They are managed and produced by WCA Entertainment.
