= Coming On Strong (song) =

- German release picture sleeve

Single by Brenda Lee

from the album Coming On Strong
- B-side: "You Keep Coming Back to Me"
- Released: 19 September 1966
- Recorded: 10 August 1966
- Genre: Rock
- Length: 2:00
- Label: Decca Records 32018
- Songwriter: Little David Wilkins

Brenda Lee singles chronology
"Ain't Gonna Cry No More" (1966)	"Coming On Strong" (1966)	"Ride, Ride, Ride" (1967)

"Coming On Strong" is a song written by Little David Wilkins and performed by Brenda Lee. The song peaked at #11 on the Billboard Hot 100 the week of December 3, 1966. The song also reached #9 in Canada and #76 in Australia. It was featured on her 1966 album, Coming on Strong.

Lee's version is referenced in the 1973 Golden Earring song "Radar Love".

The song was ranked #70 on Billboard magazine's Top Hot 100 songs of 1966.

== Other versions ==
- Don Bryant released a version of the song as a single in 1966.
- Barbara Mandrell released a version on her 1980 album, Love Is Fair.
- Toody Cole as the A-Side of a single in 1985
