= Whole Lotta Woman (Marvin Rainwater song) =

Single by Marvin Rainwater
- B-side: "Baby, Don't Go"
- Released: January 1958
- Recorded: December 1957; Nashville, Tennessee, United States
- Genre: Rockabilly
- Length: 2:37
- Label: MGM K12609 (US), 974 (UK)
- Songwriter: Marvin Rainwater
- Producer: Jim Vienneau

Marvin Rainwater singles chronology
"My Brand of Blues" (1957)	"Whole Lotta Woman" (1958)	"I Dig You Baby" (1958)

"Whole Lotta Woman" is a song written and originally performed by American country and rockabilly singer Marvin Rainwater. It was released as a single by MGM Records in January 1958.

The song was recorded in December 1957 at the Bradley Film and Recording Studio in Nashville, Tennessee, United States. Session musicians were Hank Garland (guitar), Grady Martin (guitar), Floyd "Lightnin'" Chance (bass), Buddy Harman (drums), and Floyd Cramer (piano). The session was produced by Jim Vienneau.

The record reached no. 15 on the Billboard magazine country chart, and no. 60 on the pop chart. However, it was far more successful in the United Kingdom, where it entered the UK Singles Chart on 7 March 1958, and reached the no. 1 position on 25 April, replacing Perry Como's "Magic Moments". It stayed at no. 1 in the UK for three weeks. Rainwater toured in the UK to promote the record, starting on 20 April 1958.

== Chart performance ==
Chart (1958)	Peak position
UK Singles Chart	1
US Billboard Hot 100	60
US Billboard Hot Country Singles	15
