= Rock Salt & Nails (album) =

Studio album by Steve Young
- Released: November 1969
- Recorded: 1969
- Genre: Country, country rock, folk
- Length: 41:03
- Label: A&M
- Producer: Tommy LiPuma

Steve Young chronology
Rock Salt & Nails (1969)	Seven Bridges Road (1972)

Professional ratings
Review scores
Source	Rating
Allmusic	4/5 stars

Rock Salt & Nails is the debut album by Steve Young. It is a pioneering Country rock/Outlaw country album that was recorded in 1969, with guest musicians Gram Parsons, Gene Clark and James Burton.

== Track listing ==
All tracks composed by Steve Young; except where indicated

1. "That's How Strong My Love Is" (Roosevelt Jamison)
2. "Rock Salt and Nails" (Utah Phillips)
3. "I'm a One-Woman Man" (Johnny Horton, Tillman Franks)
4. "Coyote" (Peter La Farge)
5. "Gonna Find Me a Bluebird" (Marvin Rainwater)
6. "Love in My Time"
7. "Seven Bridges Road"
8. "Kenny's Song" (Kenny Austin)
9. "Holler in the Swamp"
10. "Hoboin'" (Traditional; arranged by Steve Young)
11. "My Sweet Love Ain't Around" (Hank Williams)

== Personnel ==
- Steve Young – rhythm guitar, vocals
- James Burton – dobro, guitar
- Gram Parsons – organ, unverified guitar
- Gene Clark – harmonica on "My Sweet Love Ain't Around", unverified guitar
- David Jackson – bass
- Chris Ethridge – bass
- Richard Greene – fiddle
- Meyer Sniffin – fiddle on "Rock Salt & Nails" and "I'm a One Woman Man"
- Don Beck – guitar
- Hal Blaine – drums
- Bernie Leadon – unverified guitar

== Production ==
- Producer: Tommy LiPuma
- Recording Engineer: Dick Bogert
- Art Direction: Tom Wilkes
- Photography (front cover): Barry Feinstein
- Photography (back cover): Jim McCrary
- Liner notes: Jim McCrary, Steve Young
- Strings arranged by: Bob Thompson
- Recorded at A&M Studios, Hollywood
