= Pete Fountain =

American clarinetist (1930–2016)

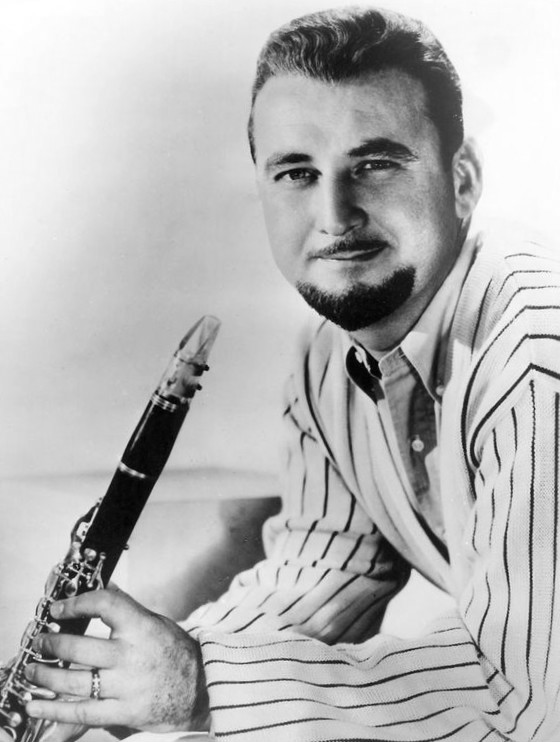
- Fountain in 1962

Background information
- Born: Pierre Dewey LaFontaine Jr. July 3, 1930; New Orleans, Louisiana, U.S.
- Died: August 6, 2016 (aged 86) New Orleans, Louisiana, U.S.
- Genres: Dixieland; jazz
- Occupation: Musician
- Instrument: Clarinet
- Years active: 1940s–2013
- Labels: Coral; Southland; Verve

Pierre Dewey LaFontaine Jr. (July 3, 1930 – August 6, 2016), known professionally as Pete Fountain, was an American jazz clarinetist.

== Early life and education ==
LaFontaine was born to Pierre, Sr. and Madeline, in a small Creole cottage-style frame house on White Street (between Dumaine Street and St. Ann Street) in New Orleans. Pete was the great-grandson of a French immigrant, François Fontaine, who was born in Toulon, circa 1796, and came to the U.S. in the early 19th century, and died on the Mississippi Gulf Coast circa 1885. Pete's father, a truck driver and part-time musician, changed the family name to Fountain.

He started playing clarinet as a child at the McDonogh 28 school located on Esplanade Avenue. As a child, young Pete was very sickly, frequently battling respiratory infections due to weakened lungs. He was given expensive medication but it proved ineffective. During a pharmacy visit, Pete's father began a discussion with a neighborhood doctor who was also there shopping and talked with him about his son's condition. The doctor agreed to see the boy the following day. After a short exam, the doctor confirmed the weak lung condition and advised the father to try an unorthodox treatment: purchase the child a musical instrument, anything he has to blow into. The same day, they went to a local music store and, given his choice of instruments, Pete chose the clarinet (after first wanting the drums, which his father declined per the doctor's orders). At first, Pete was unable to produce a sound from the instrument, but he continued to practice and eventually not only made sounds and eventually music, but greatly improved the health of his lungs.

He took private lessons but also learned to play jazz by playing along with phonograph records of first Benny Goodman and then Irving Fazola. By the time he reached his teens, he was playing regular gigs in the nightclubs on Bourbon Street. According to Fountain:

When I was a high school senior, my history teacher asked me why I didn’t study more... I answered that I was too busy playing clarinet every night, and when I told him I was making scale — about $125 a week — he said that was more than he made and I should play full time. I guess I was a professional from that point on.

One of Fountain's early engagements were with the bands of Monk Hazel. Fountain founded the Basin Street Six in 1950 with his longtime friend, trumpeter George Girard. In 1954, after the Basin Street Six folded, Fountain briefly went to Chicago to play with the Dukes of Dixieland, then returned to New Orleans and teamed up with Al Hirt to lead a band, playing an extended residence at Dan Levy’s Pier 600.

== Lawrence Welk orchestra ==
A talent scout for Lawrence Welk, who saw Fountain performing at the Pier 600, brought him to the attention of Larry Welk, son of television bandleader Lawrence Welk. Persistent persuasion from the son led the senior Welk to invite Fountain to join the Lawrence Welk orchestra in Los Angeles, where he relocated and lived for two years. Fountain became well known for his many solos on Welk's ABC television show, The Lawrence Welk Show. He was rumored to have quit when Welk refused to let him "jazz up" a Christmas carol on the 1958 Christmas show. Other accounts, including one in Fountain's autobiography A Closer Walk With Pete Fountain, indicate he in fact played a jazzy rendition of "Silver Bells" on the show which upset Welk, leading to Fountain's departure in early 1959. In an interview, Fountain said he left The Lawrence Welk Show because "champagne and bourbon don't mix." Fountain was hired by Decca Records A&R head Charles "Bud" Dant and went on to produce 42 hit albums with Dant. After Welk's death, Fountain occasionally joined with the Welk musical family for reunion shows.

== Return to New Orleans ==
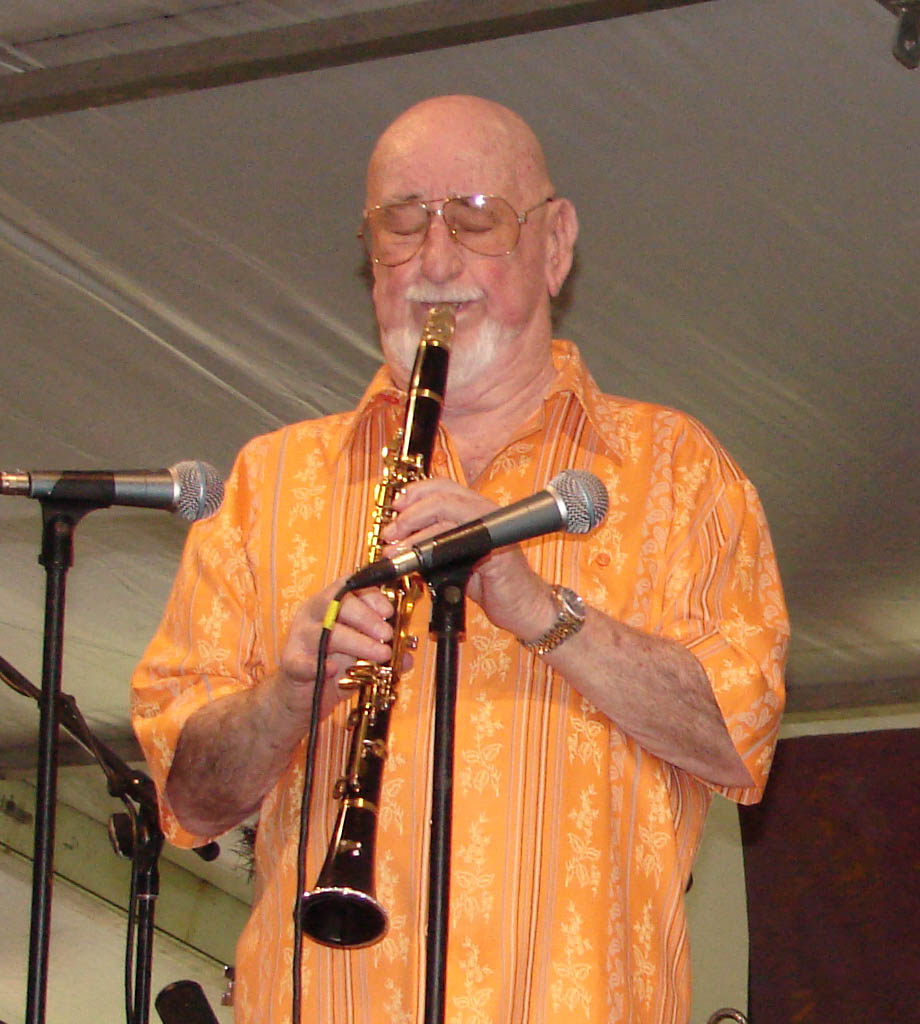
Fountain at JazzFest, 2006

Fountain returned to New Orleans, played with the Dukes of Dixieland, then began leading bands under his own name. He owned his own club in the French Quarter in the 1960s and 1970s. He later acquired "Pete Fountain's Jazz Club" at the Riverside Hilton in downtown New Orleans.

The New Orleans Jazz Club presented "Pete Fountain Day" on October 19, 1959, with celebrations honoring the pride of their city, concluding with a packed concert that evening. His Quintett was made up of his studio recording musicians, Stan Kenton's bassist Don Bagley, vibeist Godfrey Hirsch, pianist Merle Koch, and the double bass drummer Jack Sperling. Fountain brought these same players together in 1963 when they played the Hollywood Bowl. Pete would make the trek to Hollywood many times, appearing on The Tonight Show Starring Johnny Carson 56 times.

Fountain opened his club, the French Quarter Inn, located in the heart of the famed French Quarter district, at 800 Bourbon Street, in the spring of 1960. His group members were Oliver "Stick" Felix on bass, John Probst on piano, Paul Guma on guitar, Godfrey Hirsch on vibes, and Jack Sperling on drums. In no time at all, major entertainers found their way there. Cliff Arquette, popularly known as Charley Weaver, and Jonathan Winters were there on opening night and performed their comedy routines. Over the next few years Frank Sinatra, Phil Harris, Carol Lawrence and Robert Goulet, Keely Smith, Robert Mitchum, and Brenda Lee, among many others, came to the club. Many would perform with the band, and Brenda Lee's sit-in resulted in a duet record album recorded by her and Pete. Benny Goodman came to the club twice, but without bringing his clarinet.

His greatest friendly rivalry was with trumpeter Al Hirt, whose club was down the street from Fountain's. They stole musicians from each other, and sometimes came into each other's clubs and played together. They were good friends who came up together and later recorded several albums together.

In 2003, Fountain closed his club at the Hilton with a performance before a packed house filled with musical friends and fans. He began performing two nights a week at Casino Magic in Bay St. Louis, Mississippi, where he also had a home (later destroyed by Hurricane Katrina).

After heart surgery in 2006, he performed at the New Orleans Jazz and Heritage Festival and helped reopen the Bay St. Louis casino. It has since been renamed the Hollywood Casino. He performed his last show at Hollywood Casino on December 8, 2010, before returning to help reopen the resort in 2014, by which point he was mostly retired.

== Half-Fast Walking Club ==
Fountain was a founder and the most prominent member of the Half-Fast Walking Club, one of the best known freelance marching units that parade in New Orleans on Mardi Gras Day. The original name was "The Half-Assed Walking Club," and it was an excuse to take a "lubricated" musical stroll down the parade route. Pete changed the name under pressure exerted by the parade organizers. On Mardi Gras Day 2007, Pete again joined his Half-Fast Walking Club, having missed the event in 2006 due to illness.

== Musical style ==
Fountain's clarinet work was noted for his sweet fluid tone. He recorded over 100 LPs and CDs under his own name, some in the Dixieland style, many others essentially instrumental pop records with only peripheral relevance to any type of jazz. Nonetheless, in 1997 critic Doug Ramsey of Jazz Times magazine included Fountain on a list of underrated musicians, writing: "His ear for harmony and mastery of time are among the best-kept secrets in jazz because all these years he has chosen to stick with the repertoire and sidemen that make him comfortable."

The distinctive Fountain sound — more woody than most — came from the crystal mouthpieces he played with since 1949 rather than the more common rubber mouthpieces. His first crystal mouthpiece was actually Irving Fazola's, given to Pete by Fazola's mother after Faz's death, because she had heard him play and noted how he played like her son. That mouthpiece was shattered on the bandstand one night when Pete had played his solo and was standing by as trumpeter George Girard played his [own solo], and Girard brought his trumpet down suddenly on top of the mouthpiece. Pete kept the shattered mouthpiece, and played other crystal mouthpieces from then on.

Fountain led the Pete Fountain Quintett, a New Orleans French Quarter jazz band of Fountain and his Creole-style music. The "Quintett" had many musicians over the years, but primarily recorded with Jack Sperling on drums, bassists Don Bagley or Morty Corb, vibraphonist Godfrey Hirch, and pianists Merle Koch or Stan Wrightsman.

== Personal life ==
Fountain married Beverly Lang on October 27, 1951; they remained married for sixty-five years until his death. They have two sons and a daughter: Kevin, Jeffrey, and Dahra. Dahra's husband, Benny Harrell, was Fountain's manager in his later years.

Fountain died of heart failure in his home town on August 6, 2016, at the age of eighty-six. He had suffered from heart problems and was in hospice care when he died. He was interred at Metairie Cemetery.

== Awards and honors ==
- 2006, Loyola University New Orleans awarded Fountain an honorary degree.
- On March 18, 2007, Pete Fountain was inducted into the Louisiana Music Hall of Fame.
- On April 5, 2008, Fountain was inducted into the Delta Music Museum Hall of Fame in Ferriday, Louisiana.

== Selected discography ==
=== Albums ===
List of albums, with selected chart positions, and other relevant details
Title	Album details	Peak chart positions
Title	Album details	US
For the First Time (with Brenda Lee)	Released: March 15, 1968; Label: Decca; Formats: LP	187

=== Singles ===
Year	Single	Chart positions		
Year	Single	US	CB	US – AC
1960	"A Closer Walk"	93	101	
1960	"Columbus Stockade Blues"		118	
1960	"Sentimental Journey"		tag	
1962	"Yes Indeed"	69	85	
1964	"Licorice Stick"	115	94	
1964	"Humbug"		129	
1965	"Mae"	129	130	27
1965	"Gotta Travel On"		129	
1967	"Thoroughly Modern Millie"			28
1968	"Mood Indigo"(w/ Brenda Lee)		112	
1969	"Les Bicyclettes De Belsize"			24
