= Steve Young (musician) =

American country music singer-songwriter (1942–2016)

- Born: July 12, 1942; Newnan, Georgia, U.S.
- Died: March 17, 2016 (aged 73) Nashville, Tennessee, U.S.
- Genres: Country rock; Americana; alternative country; outlaw country
- Occupation: Singer-songwriter
- Instrument: Guitar
- Years active: 1962-2016
- Labels: A&M; RCA; Rounder; Watermelon

Steve Young (July 12, 1942 – March 17, 2016) was an American country music singer, songwriter and guitarist, known for his song "Seven Bridges Road" (on Rock Salt & Nails & Seven Bridges Road). He was a pioneer of the country rock, Americana, and alternative country sounds, and he was also a vital force behind the outlaw movement.

== Biography ==
Young was born in Newnan, Georgia, and grew up in Texas and Gadsden, Alabama, as his family moved from place to place looking for work. By the time he graduated from high school, he was writing and playing songs that incorporated folk, blues, country, and gospel influences he absorbed while travelling throughout the South. In the late 1960s, he worked with Van Dyke Parks and was member of the psychedelic country band Stone Country.

He is mainly a self taught musician which led to his unique style. He gained knowledge from radio recordings and local pickers and singers in Gadsden. He had various influences and an eclectic taste. Influences include Elvis Presley, Pete Seeger, Woody Guthrie, Flamenco styles, Celtic and Native American traditions, and R & B. Similar to his unique music taste, he often felt like he was unique and did not have a place. He described himself as an outcast and as though he never would fit into the places he felt he should like Los Angeles or Nashville. This led to his expansive self exploration through music and his attachment to art.

Young was one of the pioneers of "outlaw country" which influenced many other artists down the road with his writing style. He wrote many songs, including "Lonesome, On'ry and Mean" (covered by Waylon Jennings) and "Montgomery In the Rain" (covered by Hank Williams, Jr.).

During the late 1970s, Young became a Buddhist and a vegetarian.

His best-known composition is "Seven Bridges Road", which became a hit for Eagles after including a cover of it on their 1980 live album. But, contrary to popular belief, the Eagles more so reworked Iain Matthews version. Earlier covers of the song were also done by Joan Baez, Tracy Nelson & Mother Earth, Iain Matthews, Dolly Parton, and Rita Coolidge.

Young got praise from many musicians including Lucinda Williams who considered him to be just as talented as Bob Dylan. Similarly, Van Zandt and Waylon Jennings also mentioned how he is one of the best country musicians and has an incredible voice and style of guitar.

In 1984, Young charted the single "It's Not Supposed to Be That Way" on RCA Records. It peaked at No. 84 on Hot Country Songs. In 1989, Young did a mini-tour in the Northwest with singer-songwriter Tim Otto, performing in Portland and Seattle. In 1991, Otto took the cover shot for Steve Young's Solo/Live CD on Watermelon Records. Townes Van Zandt wrote the liner notes. The 1996 concert recording by Van Dyke Parks entitled Moonlighting: Live at the Ash Grove (released in 1998) was headlined by Young, although he did not appear on the recordings.

In 1993, Young played a show in Lichtenvoorde, The Netherlands, with David Olney. This show then was recorded by SCR Productions. Olney's track were released on his Live in Holland album in 1994. In 2019, an album of Young's tracks was released, also titled Live in Holland. David Olney took care of the liner notes, and performed on a few tracks on harmonica.

Steve Young rejected the business side of music and the ideals of what is correct for what a performer should do or be. He turned away from the big commercial music scene and kept his own artistic integrity intact. His son mentions how he would often tell record labels off and was so unique musically that it lead to a bit of self-sabotage when it came to his career. Due to his quest for a more spiritual way of seeing music, it is nearly impossible to find his albums in print.

In later interviews, Young mentions his struggles with alcohol and drug use. He shares how he was using everyday and it got to the point where people would not want him around. Luckily, he decided it was either change or die and he chose to change. He decided to take himself seriously and got treatment and medication. People saw him as angry and rude due to his drug use when in reality he was very sweet and gentle.

Young suffered a head injury in an October 2015 fall and his health began to deteriorate. He died after a brief stay in a Nashville, Tennessee, hospice, on March 17, 2016. He was 73.

== Discography ==
Year	Album	Label	US Country
1968	Stone Country (with Stone Country)	RCA Victor	
1969	Rock Salt & Nails	A&M	
1972	Seven Bridges Road	Reprise	
1975	Honky Tonk Man	Mountain Railroad	
1976	Renegade Picker	RCA Victor	48
1978	No Place to Fall	RCA	
1981	To Satisfy You	Mill	
1981	Seven Bridges Road (Note: Differs from 1972 release in that one new track was added, some omitted and all other tracks were remixed.)	Rounder	
1981	Old Memories	Country Roads	
1986	Look Homeward Angel	Mill	
1990	Long Time Rider	VooDoo	
1991	Solo/Live	Watermelon	
1993	Switchblades of Love	Watermelon	
1994	Lonesome, On'ry & Mean 1968-1978	Raven	
1999	Primal Young	Appleseed	
2005	Songlines Revisited - Volume One	Starry Pyramid	
2007	Stories Round the Horseshoe Bend	Starry Pyramid	
2007	Australian Tour EP 2007	Death Valley Records	
2017	Live at The Studio Kafe, Santa Rosa, CA, July 10, 1990	Kafe	
2019	Live in Holland 1993	Strictly Country Records	
