= Fool No. 1 =

1961 song performed by Brenda Lee

"Fool #1"

Single by Brenda Lee

from the album Brenda, That's All
- B-side: "Anybody But Me"
- Released: October 1961
- Recorded: 30 August 1961
- Genre: Pop
- Length: 2:25
- Label: Decca 31309
- Songwriter(s): Kathryn R. Fulton
- Producer(s): Owen Bradley

Brenda Lee singles chronology
"Dum Dum" (1961)	"Fool #1" (1961)	"Break It to Me Gently" (1962)

"Fool #1" is a song written by Kathryn R. Fulton and performed by Brenda Lee. The song was featured on Lee's 1962 album, Brenda, That's All.

== Chart performance ==
The song reached No. 3 on the Billboard Hot 100 and No.38 in the UK (where it was entitled "Fool No.1", because the # symbol was not synonymous with the word 'number' for British audiences) in 1961. The song also reached No. 1 in New Zealand and No. 23 in Australia.

The single's B-Side, "Anybody But Me", reached No. 31 on the Billboard Hot 100.

== Other versions ==
- Johnny Tillotson released a version on his 1962 album, It Keeps Right On a-Hurtin'.
- Loretta Lynn released a version on her 1964 album, Before I'm Over You.
- Connie Smith released a version on her 1969 album, Back in Baby's Arms.
- Marie Osmond released a version on her 1973 album, Paper Roses.
