= All Alone Am I =

Single by Brenda Lee

from the album All Alone Am I
- B-side: "Save All Your Lovin' For Me"
- Released: 24 September 1962
- Recorded: 9 August 1962
- Length: 2:41
- Label: Decca
- Composer: Manos Hadjidakis
- Lyricist: Arthur Altman (English)
- Producer: Owen Bradley

Brenda Lee singles chronology
"It Started All Over Again" (1962)	"All Alone Am I" (1962)	"Save All Your Lovin' For Me" (1962)

"All Alone Am I" is a song from 1962 popularized by American singer Brenda Lee. The song was originally composed by Greek composer Manos Hadjidakis and recorded in Greek by Tzeni Karezi for the soundtrack of the film To nisi ton genneon (The Island of the Brave); the original song in Greek is titled "Μην τον ρωτάς τον ουρανό" ("Min ton rotas ton ourano", translation: "Don't Ask the Sky"). Later, a new version of the song with English lyrics was produced by Owen Bradley and appeared as the title track on one of Lee's albums. The song is written in the key of F major, but begins on the subdominant B-flat major 7th chord.

== Background ==
In 1960, the Greek film Never on Sunday was released to considerable acclaim, earning multiple Academy Award nominations in the U.S. The film's star, Melina Mercouri, was nominated for Best Actress, while the title song from the film won the Oscar for Best Original Song for Greek musician Manos Hatzidakis, who had composed the music used in the film. A melody that appeared in both Never on Sunday and The Island of the Brave was sent to Lee's management as a tune to be considered for the singer to record, and after being translated into English by Arthur Altman, became "All Alone Am I".

== Chart performance ==
"All Alone Am I" became a top-10 pop hit in both the U.S. and the UK. The song peaked at number three on the Billboard Hot 100 chart in November 1962 and number seven on the UK Singles Chart in February 1963. The song also spent five weeks atop the U.S. Billboard easy listening chart in November and December 1962, Lee's only song to do so. The B-side to the single, "Save All Your Lovin' for Me", reached number 53 on the U.S. pop chart.

Chart (1962–63)	Peak position
Ireland (IRMA)	10
UK Singles (The Official Charts Company)	7
U.S. Billboard Middle Road Singles	1
US Billboard Hot 100	3

== See also ==
- List of number-one adult contemporary singles of 1962 (U.S.)
