= The Jazz Singer =

1927 film by Alan Crosland

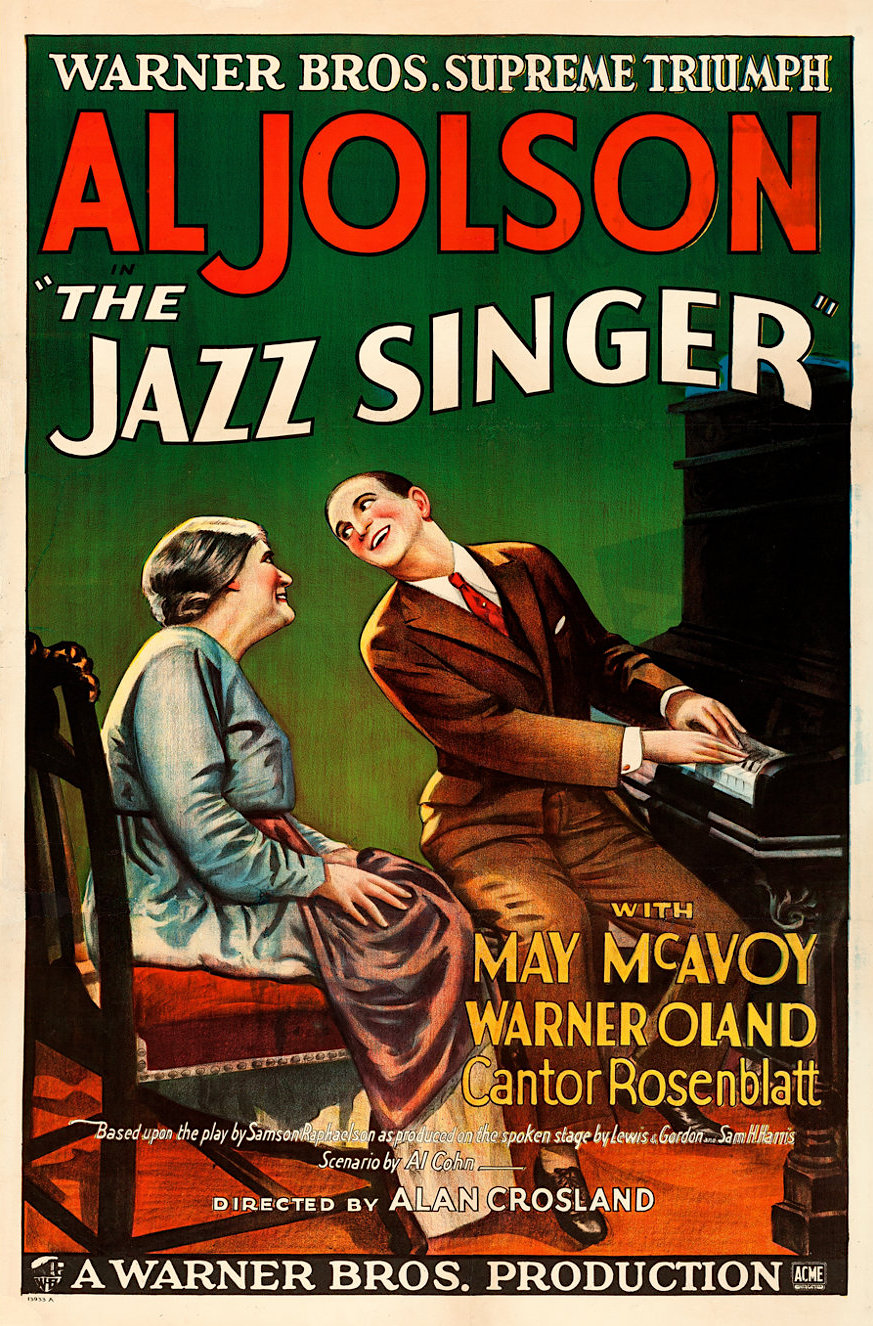
- Theatrical release poster
- Directed by: Alan Crosland
- Screenplay by: Alfred A. Cohn
- Based on: The Jazz Singer by Samson Raphaelson
- Produced by: Darryl F. Zanuck
- Starring: Al Jolson; May McAvoy; Warner Oland; Eugenie Besserer
- Cinematography: Hal Mohr
- Edited by: Harold McCord
- Music by: Louis Silvers
- Production companies: Warner Bros. Pictures; The Vitaphone Corporation
- Distributed by: Warner Bros. Pictures
- Release date: October 6, 1927
- Running time: 89 minutes 96 minutes (with overture and exit music)
- Country: United States
- Language: English
- Budget: $422,000
- Box office: $2.6 million (gross rental)

The Jazz Singer is a 1927 American part-talkie musical drama film directed by Alan Crosland and produced by Warner Bros. Pictures. It is the first feature-length motion picture with both synchronized recorded music and lip-synchronous singing and speech (in several isolated sequences). Its release heralded the commercial ascendance of sound films and effectively marked the end of the silent film era with the Vitaphone sound-on-disc system, featuring six songs performed by Al Jolson. Based on the 1925 play of the same title by Samson Raphaelson, the plot was adapted from his short story "The Day of Atonement".

The film depicts the fictional story of Jakie Rabinowitz, a young man who defies the traditions of his devout Jewish family. After singing popular tunes in a beer garden, he is punished by his father, a hazzan (cantor), prompting Jakie to run away from home. Some years later, now calling himself Jack Robin, he has become a talented jazz singer, performing in blackface. He attempts to build a career as an entertainer, but his professional ambitions ultimately come into conflict with the demands of his home and heritage.

Darryl F. Zanuck won an Academy Honorary Award for producing the film; Alfred A. Cohn was nominated for Best Writing (Adaptation) at the 1st Academy Awards. In 1996, The Jazz Singer was selected for preservation in the United States National Film Registry by the Library of Congress as being "culturally, historically or aesthetically significant". In 1998, the film was chosen in voting conducted by the American Film Institute as one of the best American films of all time, ranking at number ninety. The film's copyright expired on January 1, 2023, when all works published in the U.S. in 1927 entered the public domain.

== Plot ==
The Jazz Singer (1927)

Cantor Rabinowitz wants his 13-year-old son, Jacob "Jakie" Rabinowitz, to carry on the generations-old family tradition and become a cantor at the synagogue in the Jewish ghetto of Manhattan's Lower East Side. Jakie has instead taken a liking to singing jazz at the local beer garden. Moisha Yudelson spots the boy and tells Jakie's father, who drags him home. Jakie clings to his mother, Sara, as his father declares, "I'll teach him better than to debase the voice God gave him!" Jakie threatens: "If you whip me again, I'll run away—and never come back!" After the whipping, Jakie kisses his mother goodbye and, true to his word, runs away. At the Yom Kippur service, Rabinowitz mournfully tells a fellow celebrant, "My son was to stand at my side and sing tonight—but now I have no son." As the sacred Kol Nidre is sung, Jakie sneaks back home to retrieve a picture of his loving mother.

About ten years later, Jakie has anglicized his name to Jack Robin. Jack is called up from his table at a cabaret to perform on stage ("Dirty Hands, Dirty Face").

Jack wows the crowd with his energized rendition of "Toot, Toot, Tootsie". Afterward, he is introduced to the beautiful Mary Dale, a musical theater dancer. "There are lots of jazz singers, but you have a tear in your voice", she says, offering to help with his budding career. With her help, Jack eventually gets his big break: a leading part in the new musical April Follies.

Back at the family home Jack left long ago, the elder Rabinowitz is instructing a young student in the traditional cantorial art. Jack appears, attempting to explain his perspective and his love for modern music, but the appalled cantor dismisses him, saying, "I never want to see you again—you jazz singer!" As Jack leaves, he makes a prediction: "I came home with a heart full of love, but you don't want to understand. Someday you'll understand, just as Mama does."

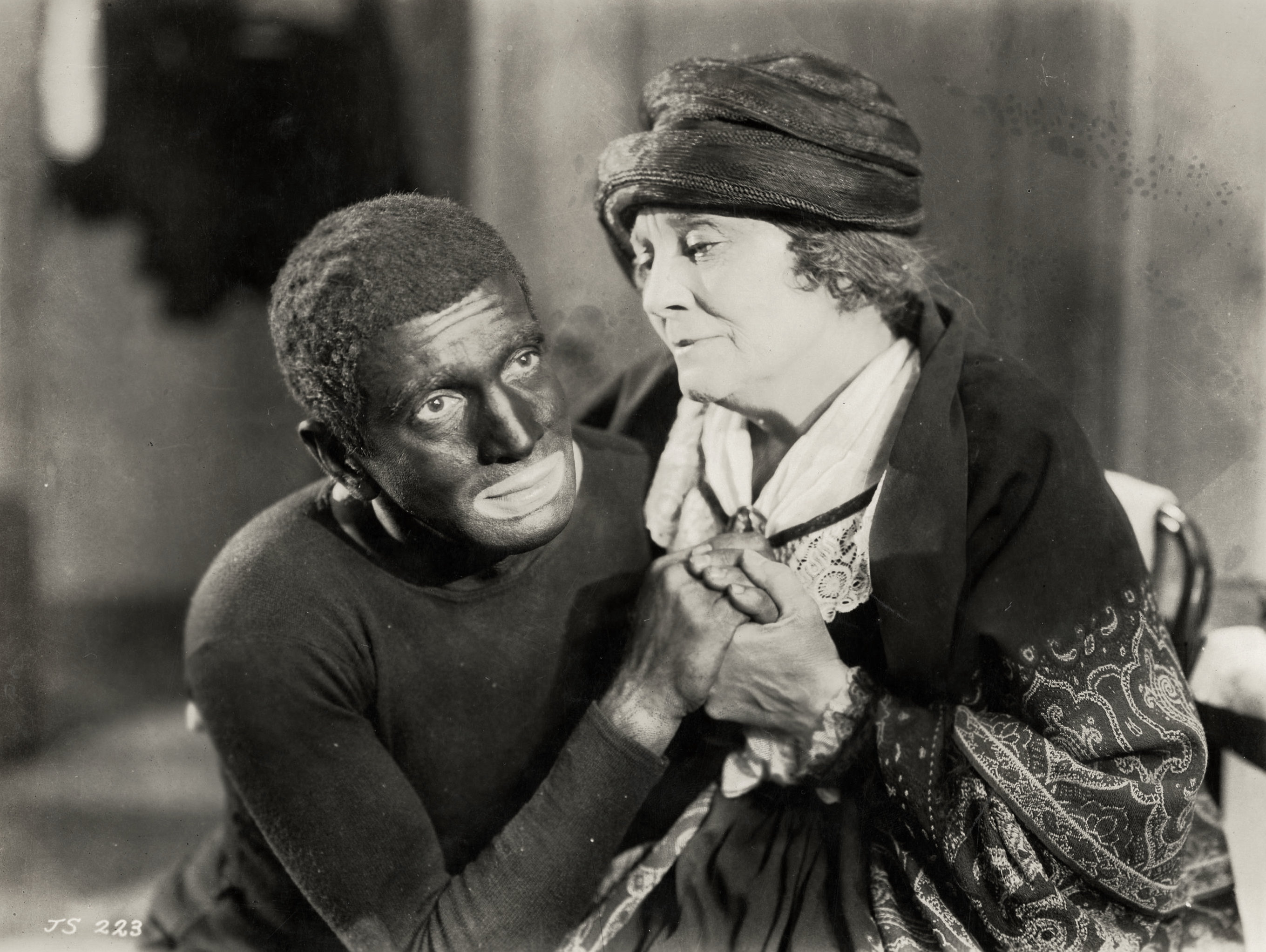
Jack and his mother (Eugenie Besserer)

Two weeks after Jack's expulsion from the family home and 24 hours before the opening night of April Follies on Broadway, Jack's father falls gravely ill. Jack is asked to choose between the show and duty to his family and faith: in order to sing the Kol Nidre for Yom Kippur in his father's place, he will have to miss the big premiere.

That evening, the eve of Yom Kippur, Yudelson tells the Jewish elders, "For the first time, we have no Cantor on the Day of Atonement." Lying in his bed, weak and gaunt, Cantor Rabinowitz tells Sara that he cannot perform on the most sacred of holy days: "My son came to me in my dreams—he sang Kol Nidre so beautifully. If he would only sing like that tonight—surely he would be forgiven."

As Jack prepares for a dress rehearsal by applying blackface makeup, he and Mary discuss his career aspirations and the family pressures they agree he must resist. Sara and Yudelson come to Jack's dressing room to plead for him to come to his father and sing in his stead. Jack is torn. He delivers his blackface performance ("Mother of Mine, I Still Have You"), and Sara sees her son on stage for the first time. She has a tearful revelation: "Here he belongs. If God wanted him in His house, He would have kept him there. He's not my boy anymore—he belongs to the whole world now."

Afterward, Jack returns to the Rabinowitz home. He kneels at his father's bedside and the two converse fondly: "My son—I love you." Sara suggests that it may help heal his father if Jack takes his place at the Yom Kippur service. Mary arrives with the producer, who warns Jack that he'll never work on Broadway again if he fails to appear on opening night. Jack cannot decide. Mary challenges him: "Were you lying when you said your career came before everything?" Jack is unsure if he even can replace his father: "I haven't sung Kol Nidre since I was a little boy." His mother tells him, "Do what is in your heart, Jakie—if you sing and God is not in your voice—your father will know." The producer cajoles Jack: "You're a jazz singer at heart!"

At the theater, the opening night audience is told that there will be no performance. Jack sings the Kol Nidre in his father's place. His father listens from his deathbed to the nearby ceremony and speaks his last, forgiving words: "Mama, we have our son again." The spirit of Jack's father is shown at his side in the synagogue. Mary has come to listen. She sees how Jack has reconciled the division in his soul: "a jazz singer—singing to his God."

"The season passes—and time heals—the show goes on." Jack, as "The Jazz Singer", is now appearing at the Winter Garden theater, apparently as the featured performer opening for a show called Back Room. In the front row of the packed theater, his mother sits alongside Yudelson. Jack, in blackface, performs the song "My Mammy" for her and for the world.

== Cast ==
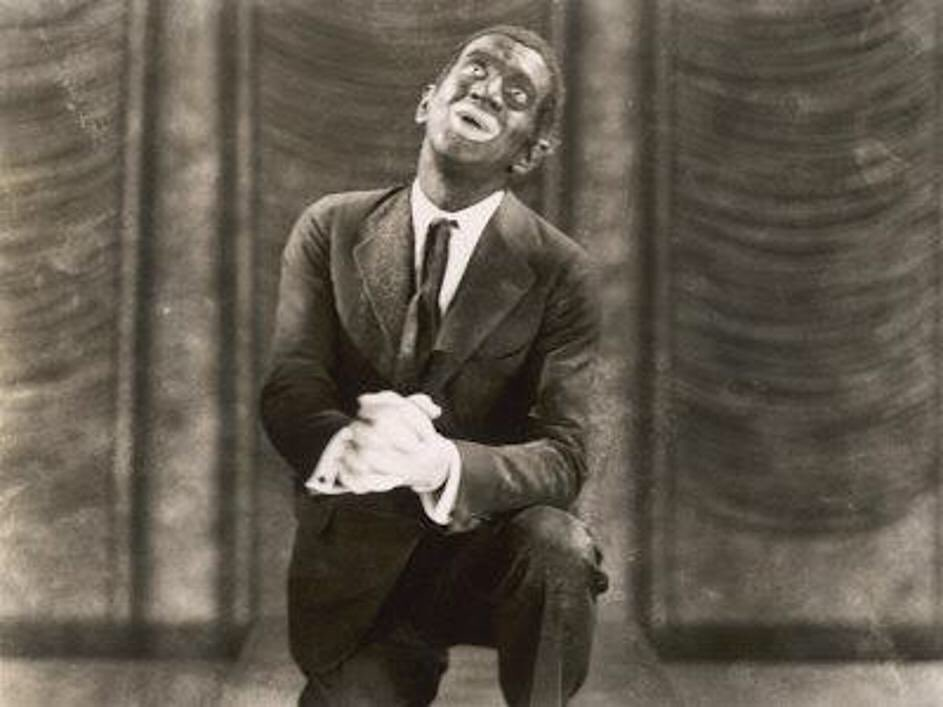
Jack Robin on stage, in a publicity shot representing the film's final scene

- Al Jolson as Jacob "Jakie" Rabinowitz (Jack Robin)
  - Bobby Gordon as Jakie Rabinowitz (age 13)
- Warner Oland as Cantor Rabinowitz, Jakie Rabinowitz's (Jack Robin's) father
- Eugenie Besserer as Sara Rabinowitz, Jakie Rabinowitz's (Jack Robin's) mother
- May McAvoy as Mary Dale
- Otto Lederer as Moisha Yudelson
- Richard Tucker as Harry Lee
- Yossele Rosenblatt as himself

== Songs ==
- "My Gal Sal" (music and lyrics by Paul Dresser; dubbed by unknown singer with Bobby Gordon onscreen)
- "Waiting for the Robert E. Lee" (music by Lewis F. Muir and lyrics by L. Wolfe Gilbert; dubbed by unknown singer with Bobby Gordon onscreen)
- "Yussel, Yussel" (music by Samuel Steinberg and lyrics by Nellie Casman, 1923); heard as background music as Jolson walks through his ghetto neighborhood.
- "Kol Nidre" (traditional; dubbed by Joseph Diskay with Warner Oland onscreen; sung also by Al Jolson)
- "Dirty Hands, Dirty Face" (music by James V. Monaco and lyrics by Edgar Leslie and Grant Clarke; sung by Al Jolson)
- "Toot, Toot, Tootsie (Goo' Bye)" (music and lyrics by Gus Kahn, Ernie Erdman, and Dan Russo [title orthography and songwriting credits per original sheet music cover; some other sources do not mention Russo and some also name either or both Ted Fio Rito and Robert A. King]; sung by Al Jolson)
- "Kaddish" (traditional; sung by Cantor Yossele Rosenblatt)
- "Yahrzeit Licht"; sung by Cantor Yossele Rosenblatt
- "Blue Skies" (music and lyrics by Irving Berlin; sung by Al Jolson)
- "Mother of Mine, I Still Have You" (music by Louis Silvers and lyrics by Grant Clarke [Jolson also credited by some sources]; sung by Al Jolson)
- "My Mammy" (music by Walter Donaldson and lyrics by Sam M. Lewis and Joe Young; sung by Al Jolson)

== Production ==
=== Concept and development ===
On April 25, 1917, Samson Raphaelson, a native of New York City's Lower East Side and a University of Illinois undergraduate, attended a performance of the musical Robinson Crusoe, Jr. in Champaign, Illinois. The star of the show was a thirty-year-old singer, Al Jolson, a Lithuanian-born Jew who performed in blackface. In a 1927 interview, Raphaelson described the experience: "I shall never forget the first five minutes of Jolson—his velocity, the amazing fluidity with which he shifted from a tremendous absorption in his audience to a tremendous absorption in his song." He explained that he had seen emotional intensity like Jolson's only among synagogue cantors.

A few years later, pursuing a professional literary career, Raphaelson wrote "The Day of Atonement", a short story about a young Jew named Jakie Rabinowitz, based on Jolson's real life. The story was published in January 1922 in Everybody's Magazine. Raphaelson later adapted the story into a stage play, The Jazz Singer. A straight drama, all the singing in Raphaelson's version takes place offstage. With George Jessel in the lead role, the show premiered at the Warner Theatre in Times Square in September 1925 and became a hit. Warner Bros. acquired the movie rights to the play on June 4, 1926, and signed Jessel to a contract. The Moving Picture World published a story in February 1927 announcing that production on the film would begin with Jessel on May 1.

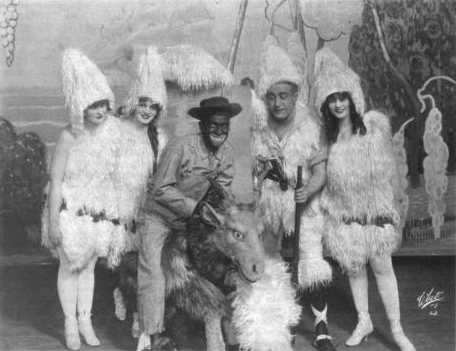
A blackfaced Al Jolson starring in Robinson Crusoe, Jr.—the performance that inspired the story that led to the play that became the film The Jazz Singer

But the plans to make the film with Jessel would fall through, for multiple reasons. Jessel's contract with Warner Bros. had not anticipated that the movie they had particularly signed him for would be made with sound (he'd made a modestly budgeted, silent comedy in the interim). When Warner had hits with two Vitaphone, though dialogue-less, features in late 1926, The Jazz Singer production had been reconceived. Jessel asked for a bonus or a new contract, but was rebuffed. According to Jessel's description in his autobiography, Harry Warner "was having a tough time with the financing of the company... He talked about taking care of me if the picture was a success. I did not feel that was enough." In fact, around the beginning of 1927, Harry Warner—the eldest of the brothers who ran the eponymous studio—had sold $4 million of his personal stock to keep the studio solvent. Then came another major issue. According to Jessel, a first read of screenwriter Alfred A. Cohn's adaptation "threw me into a fit. Instead of the boy's leaving the theatre and following the traditions of his father by singing in the synagogue, as in the play, the picture scenario had him return to the Winter Garden as a blackface comedian, with his mother wildly applauding in the box. I raised hell. Money or no money, I would not do this."

According to performer Eddie Cantor, as negotiations between Warner Bros. and Jessel floundered, Jack L. Warner and the studio's production chief, Darryl Zanuck, called to see if he was interested in the part. Cantor, a friend of Jessel's, responded that he was sure any differences with the actor could be worked out and offered his assistance. Cantor was not invited to participate in the Jessel talks; instead, the role was then offered to Jolson, who had inspired it in the first place. Describing Jolson as the production's best choice for its star, film historian Donald Crafton wrote, "The entertainer, who sang jazzed-up minstrel numbers in blackface, was at the height of his phenomenal popularity. Anticipating the later stardom of crooners and rock stars, Jolson electrified audiences with the vitality and sex appeal of his songs and gestures, which owed much to black american sources." As described by film historian Robert L. Carringer, "Jessel was a vaudeville comedian and master of ceremonies with one successful play and one modestly successful film to his credit. Jolson was a superstar." Jolson took the part, signing a $75,000 contract on May 26, 1927, for eight weeks of services beginning in July. There have been several claims but no proof that Jolson invested some of his own money in the film. Jessel and Jolson, also friends, did not speak for some time after—on the one hand, Jessel had been confiding his problems with the Warners to Jolson; on the other, Jolson had signed with them without telling Jessel of his plans. In his autobiography, Jessel wrote that, in the end, Jolson "must not be blamed, as the Warners had definitely decided that I was out."

=== Introduction of sound ===
While many earlier sound films had dialogue, all were short subjects. D. W. Griffith's feature Dream Street (1921) was shown in New York with a single singing sequence and crowd noises, using the sound-on-disc system Photokinema. The film was preceded by a program of sound shorts, including a sequence with Griffith speaking directly to the audience, but the feature itself had no talking scenes. On April 15, 1923, Lee De Forest introduced the sound-on-film system Phonofilm, which had synchronized sound and dialogue, but the sound quality was poor, and the films produced in this process were short films only.

The first Warner Bros. Vitaphone features, Don Juan (premiered August 1926) and The Better 'Ole (premiered October 1926), like three more that followed in early 1927 (When a Man Loves, Old San Francisco, and The First Auto), had only a synchronized instrumental score and sound effects. The Jazz Singer contains those, as well as numerous synchronized singing sequences and some synchronized speech: Two popular tunes are performed by the young Jakie Rabinowitz, the future Jazz Singer; his father, a cantor, performs the devotional Kol Nidre; the famous cantor Yossele Rosenblatt, appearing as himself, sings an excerpt of another religious melody, Kaddish, and the song "Yahrzeit Licht". As the adult Jack Robin, Jolson performs six songs: five popular "jazz" tunes and the Kol Nidre. The sound for the film was recorded by British-born George Groves, who had also worked on Don Juan. To direct, the studio chose Alan Crosland, who already had two Vitaphone films to his credit: Don Juan and Old San Francisco, which opened while The Jazz Singer was in production.

"Wait a minute, wait a minute..."
The spoken words that made movie history (over considerable crowd noise) and "Toot, Toot, Tootsie (Goo' Bye)"

Jolson's first vocal performance, about fifteen minutes into the picture, is of "Dirty Hands, Dirty Face", with music by James V. Monaco and lyrics by Edgar Leslie and Grant Clarke. The first synchronized speech, uttered by Jack to a cabaret crowd and to the piano player in the band that accompanies him, occurs directly after that performance, beginning at the 17:25 mark of the film. Jack's first spoken words—"Wait a minute, wait a minute, you ain't heard nothin' yet"—were well-established stage patter of Jolson's. He had even spoken very similar lines in an earlier short, A Plantation Act (1926). The line had become virtually an in-joke. In November 1918, during a gala concert celebrating the end of World War I, Jolson ran onstage amid the applause for the preceding performer, the great operatic tenor Enrico Caruso, and exclaimed, "Folks, you ain't heard nothin' yet." The following year, he recorded the song "You Ain't Heard Nothin' Yet". In a later scene, Jack talks with his mother, played by Eugenie Besserer, in the family parlor; his father enters and pronounces one very conclusive word, "Stop!", the final line of dialogue in the film.

In total, the movie contains barely two minutes' worth of synchronized talking, much or all of it improvised. The rest of the dialogue is presented through the caption cards, or intertitles, standard in silent movies of the era; as was common, those titles were composed not by the film's scenarist, Alfred Cohn, but by another writer – in this case, Jack Jarmuth.

While Jolson was touring with a stage show during June 1927, production on The Jazz Singer began with the shooting of exterior scenes by the second unit. In late June, Alan Crosland headed to New York City to shoot the Lower East Side and Winter Garden exteriors on location. Jolson joined the production in mid-July (his contract specified July 11). Filming with Jolson began with his silent scenes; the more complex Vitaphone sequences were primarily done in late August. Both Jolson and Zanuck would later take credit for thinking up the ad-libbed dialogue sequence between Jack and his mother; another story had it that Sam Warner was impressed by Jolson's brief ad-libbing in the cabaret scene and had Cohn come up with some lines on the spot. On September 23, Motion Picture News reported that production on the film had been completed.

The production cost for The Jazz Singer was $422,000 (approximately US$6.11 million in 2024 dollars), a large sum, especially for Warner Bros., which rarely spent more than $250,000. It was by no means a record for the studio, however; two features starring John Barrymore had been costlier: The Sea Beast (1926), a loose and entirely silent adaptation of Moby-Dick, at $503,000 and Don Juan at $546,000. Nonetheless, the outlay constituted a major gamble in light of the studio's financial straits: while The Jazz Singer was in production, Harry Warner stopped taking a salary, pawned jewelry belonging to his wife, and moved his family into a smaller apartment.

== Premiere and reception ==
Original trailer of The Jazz Singer

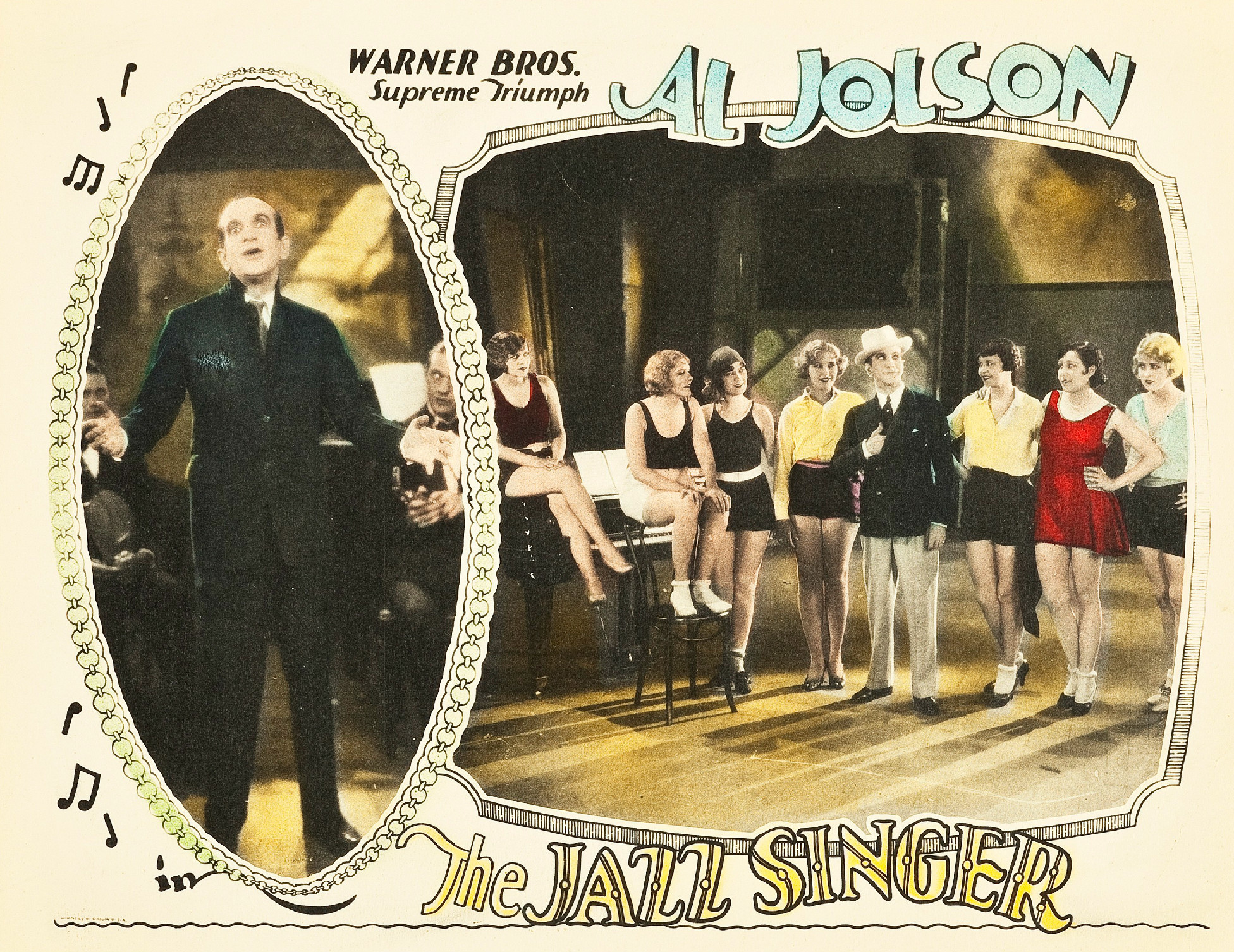
Lobby card

The premiere occurred on October 6, 1927, at Warner Bros.' flagship theater in New York. In keeping with the film's theme of a conflict within a Jewish family, the film premiered after sunset on the eve of the Yom Kippur holiday. The buildup to the premiere was tense. Besides Warner Bros.' precarious financial position, the physical presentation of the film itself was remarkably complex:

Each of Jolson's musical numbers was mounted on a separate reel with a separate accompanying sound disc. Even though the film was only eighty-nine minutes long ... there were fifteen reels and fifteen discs to manage, and the projectionist had to be able to thread the film and cue up the Vitaphone records very quickly. The least stumble, hesitation, or human error would result in public and financial humiliation for the company.

None of the four Warner brothers were able to attend: Sam Warner—among them the strongest advocate for Vitaphone—had died the previous day of pneumonia, and the surviving brothers had returned to California for his funeral.

According to Doris Warner, who was in attendance, about halfway through the film she began to feel that something exceptional was taking place. Suddenly, Jolson's face appeared in big close-up, and said "Wait a minute, wait a minute, you ain't heard nothing yet!" Jolson's "Wait a minute" line prompted a loud, positive response from the audience, who were dumbfounded by seeing and hearing someone speak on a film for the first time, so much so that the double-entendre was missed at first. Applause followed each of his songs. Excitement built, and when Jolson and Eugenie Besserer began their dialogue scene, "the audience became hysterical." After the show, the audience turned into a "milling, battling, mob", in one journalist's description, chanting "Jolson, Jolson, Jolson!" Among those who reviewed the film, the critic who foresaw most clearly what it presaged for the future of cinema was Life magazine's Robert E. Sherwood. He described the spoken dialogue scene between Jolson and Besserer as "fraught with tremendous significance... I for one suddenly realized that the end of the silent drama is in sight".

Critical reaction was generally, though far from universally, positive. The New York Times critic Mordaunt Hall, reviewing the film's premiere, declared that

not since the first presentation of Vitaphone features, more than a year ago (i.e. Don Juan), has anything like the ovation been heard in a motion-picture theatre... The Vitaphoned songs and some dialogue have been introduced most adroitly. This in itself is an ambitious move, for in the expression of song the Vitaphone vitalizes the production enormously. The dialogue is not so effective, for it does not always catch the nuances of speech or inflections of the voice so that one is not aware of the mechanical features.

Variety called it "[u]ndoubtedly the best thing Vitaphone has ever put on the screen ... [with] abundant power and appeal." Richard Watts Jr. of the New York Herald Tribune called it a "pleasantly sentimental orgy dealing with a struggle between religion and art... [T]his is not essentially a motion picture, but rather a chance to capture for comparative immortality the sight and sound of a great performer." The Exhibitors Herald's take was virtually identical: "scarcely a motion picture. It should be more properly labeled an enlarged Vitaphone record of Al Jolson in half a dozen songs." The film received favorable reviews in both the Jewish press and in African American newspapers such as the Baltimore Afro-American, the New York Amsterdam News, and the Pittsburgh Courier. The headline of the Los Angeles Times review told a somewhat different story: "'Jazz Singer' Scores a Hit—Vitaphone and Al Jolson Responsible, Picture Itself Second Rate." Photoplay dismissed Jolson as "no movie actor. Without his Broadway reputation he wouldn't rate as a minor player."

== Commercial impact and industrial influence ==
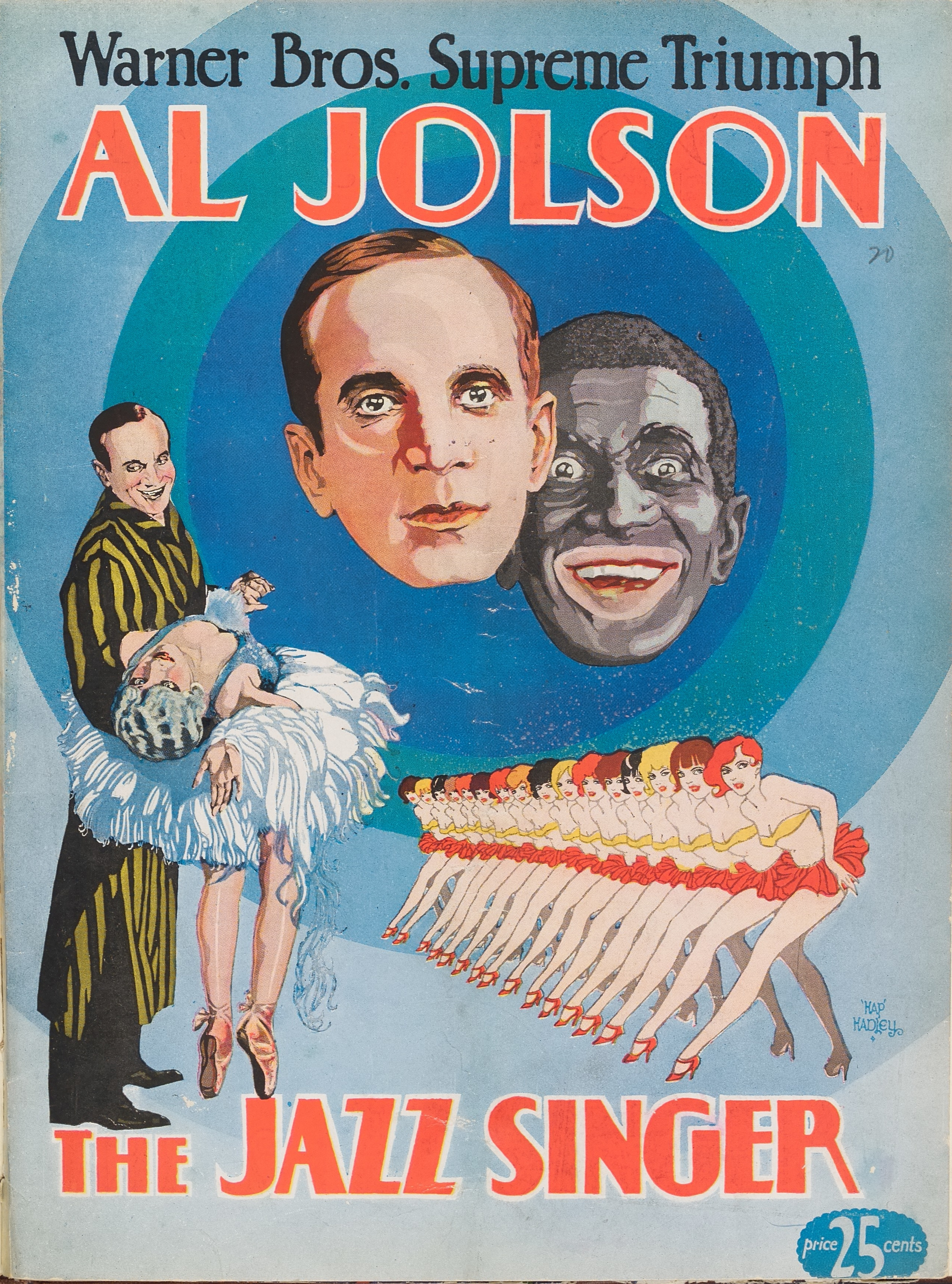
One of many alternative posters—this one designed for theaters charging 25 cents; the image of Jack in a suggestive nightrobe, carrying Mary, does appear in the film, shortly after he sees her perform for the first time.

The film developed into a major hit, demonstrating the profit potential of feature-length "talkies", but Donald Crafton has shown that the reputation the film later acquired for being one of Hollywood's most enormous successes to date was inflated. The movie did well, but not astonishingly so, in the major cities where it was first released, garnering much of its impressive profits with long, steady runs in population centers large and small all around the country. As conversion of movie theaters to sound was still in its early stages, the film actually arrived at many of those secondary venues in a silent version. On the other hand, Crafton's statement that The Jazz Singer "was in a distinct second or third tier of attractions compared to the most popular films of the day and even other Vitaphone talkies" is also incorrect. In fact, the film was easily the biggest earner in Warner Bros. history, and would remain so until it was surpassed a year later by The Singing Fool, another Jolson feature. In the larger scope of Hollywood, among films originally released in 1927, available evidence suggests that The Jazz Singer was among the three biggest box office hits, trailing only Wings and, perhaps, The King of Kings. (Note: For the following earnings of Don Juan, The Jazz Singer, and other early Vitaphone features, see Glancy (1995) [pp. 4–5 online] (and, for the domestic earnings of The Jazz Singer, Crafton [1999], p. 528). Unlike the total box office revenue figures estimated in the main text, the following figures refer to the studio's share: Don Juan (non-talking), premiered August 6, 1926: $1.695 million total (domestic & foreign) [new Warner Bros. record] Thomas Schatz (1998) claims that Don Juan "was much less successful than the previous Barrymore vehicle, The Sea Beast" (p. 63). This claim is belied by Glancy's figures, which show total earnings of $938,000 for The Sea Beast [p. 2 online].; The Better 'Ole (non-talking), premiered October 7, 1926: just over $1 million total (dom. & for.); When a Man Loves (non-talking), premiered February 3, 1927: just over $1 million total (dom. & for.); Old San Francisco (non-talking), premiered June 21, 1927: $638,000 total (dom. & for.); The Jazz Singer (part-talkie), premiered October 6, 1927: $2.625 million total (dom. & for.) [new Warner Bros. record]/$1.97 million domestic These figures apparently include earnings from the film's 1931 re-release. While no authoritative source has broken out those numbers from those of the initial release, even if they constitute as much as 25 percent of the total (a generous assumption), The Jazz Singer still set a Warner Bros. record in its initial release and was one of the top films of the 1927–28 exhibition season.; Tenderloin (part-talkie), premiered March 14, 1928: just under $1 million total (dom. & for.); Glorious Betsy (part-talkie), premiered April 26, 1928: just under $1 million total (dom. & for.); The Lion and the Mouse (part-talkie), premiered May 21, 1928: just under $1 million total (dom. & for.); Lights of New York (all-talking), premiered July 6, 1928: $1.252 million total (dom. & for.); The Singing Fool (part-talkie), premiered September 19, 1928: $5.916 million total (dom. & for.) [new Warner Bros. record]; Scholar James Mark Purcell ranks the attendance of 1927's top three films in the following order: Wings, The Jazz Singer, The King of Kings (see Koszarski [1994], p. 33). For the earnings of The King of Kings, see also David Pierce (1991). "Costs and Grosses for the Early Films of Cecil B. DeMille". The Silent Film Bookshelf. Cinemaweb. Archived from the original on April 2, 2010. Pierce states that it "seems likely that the gross numbers" he conveys are actually "income after deduction of distribution costs"; he says, as well, that it is unclear if the $2.64 million figure he reports for The King of Kings is total or only domestic. Note that his article correctly dates the film as 1927 in its main text and incorrectly as 1926 in the relevant table. Reported figures for Wings differ widely, but a survey of anecdotal accounts and a triangulation of box office claims combine to suggest—in accord with Purcell—that it was a slightly bigger smash than The Jazz Singer.)

According to Warner Bros. records, the film earned revenues of $1,974,000 in the United States and Canada, and $651,000 elsewhere, for a worldwide theatrical gross rental of approximately $2.6 million (the studio's share of the box office gross) and a profit of $1,196,750.

One of the keys to the film's success was an innovative marketing scheme conceived by Sam Morris, Warner Bros.' sales manager. In Crafton's description:

[A] special clause in Warners' Vitaphone exhibition contract virtually guaranteed long runs. Theaters had to book The Jazz Singer for full rather than split weeks. Instead of the traditional flat rental fee, Warners took a percentage of the gate. A sliding scale meant that the exhibitor's take increased the longer the film was held over. The signing of this contract by the greater New York Fox Theatres circuit was regarded as a headline-making precedent.

Similar arrangements, based on a percentage of the gross rather than flat rental fees, would soon become standard for the U.S. film industry's high-end or "A" product.

Though in retrospect it is understood that the success of The Jazz Singer signaled the end of the silent motion-picture era, this was not immediately apparent. Mordaunt Hall, for example, praised Warner Bros. for "astutely realiz[ing] that a film conception of The Jazz Singer was one of the few subjects that would lend itself to the use of the Vitaphone." In historian Richard Koszarski's words, "Silent films did not disappear overnight, nor did talking films immediately flood the theaters... Nevertheless, 1927 remains the year that Warner Bros. moved to close the book on the history of silent pictures, even if their original goal had been somewhat more modest."

The film had other effects that were more immediate. George Jessel, who was in his third season touring with the stage production of The Jazz Singer, later described what happened to his show—perhaps anticipating how sound would soon cement Hollywood's dominance of the American entertainment industry: "A week or two after the Washington engagement, the sound-and-picture version of The Jazz Singer with Al Jolson was sweeping the country, and I was swept out of business. I couldn't compete with a picture theatre across the street showing the first great sound picture in the world ... for fifty cents, while the price at my theatre was $3.00."

As the truly pivotal event, Crafton points to the national release of the film's sound version in early 1928—he dates it to January, Block and Wilson to February 4. In March, Warner announced that The Jazz Singer was playing at a record 235 theaters (though many could still show it only silently). In May, a consortium including the leading Hollywood studios signed up with Western Electric's licensing division, ERPI, for sound conversion. In July, Warner Bros. released the first all-talking feature, Lights of New York, a musical crime melodrama.

On September 27, The Jazz Singer became the first feature-length talking picture to be shown in Europe when it premiered at London's Piccadilly Theatre. The movie "created a sensation", according to British film historian Rachael Low. "The Jazz Singer was a turning point [for the introduction of sound]. The Bioscope greeted it with, 'We are inclined to wonder why we ever called them Living Pictures.'" The Paris sound premiere followed in January 1929.

Before the 1st Academy Awards ceremony was held in May 1929, honoring films released between August 1927 and July 1928, The Jazz Singer was ruled ineligible for the two top prizes—the Outstanding Picture, Production and the Unique and Artistic Production—on the basis that it would have been unfair competition for the silent pictures under consideration. By mid-1929, Hollywood was producing almost exclusively sound films; by the end of the following year, the same was true in much of Western Europe. Jolson went on to make a series of movies for Warner, including The Singing Fool, a part-talkie, and the all-talking features Say It with Songs (1929), Mammy (1930), and Big Boy (1930).

== Critical analysis ==
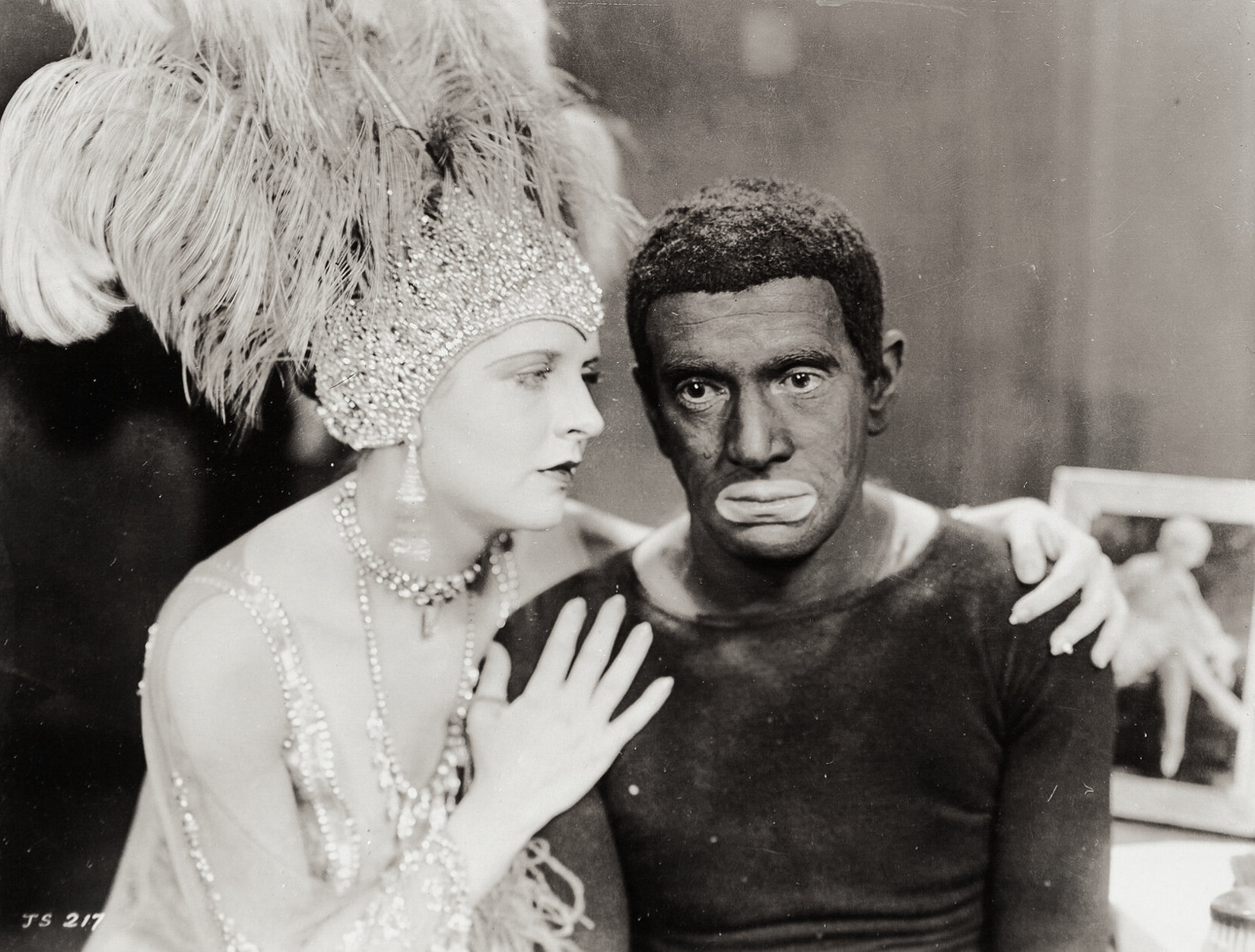
Mary (May McAvoy) and Jack, preparing for dress rehearsal: the first blackface scene

Jack Robin's use of blackface in his Broadway stage act—a common practice at the time, which is now widely condemned as racist—is the primary focus of many Jazz Singer studies. Its crucial and unusual role is described by scholar Corin Willis:

In contrast to the racial jokes and innuendo brought out in its subsequent persistence in early sound film, blackface imagery in The Jazz Singer is at the core of the film's central theme, an expressive and artistic exploration of the notion of duplicity and ethnic hybridity within American identity. Of the more than seventy examples of blackface in early sound film 1927–53 that I have viewed (including the nine blackface appearances Jolson subsequently made), The Jazz Singer is unique in that it is the only film where blackface is central to the narrative development and thematic expression.

The function and meaning of blackface in the film is intimately involved with Jack's own Jewish heritage and his desire to make his mark in mass American culture—much as the ethnically Jewish Jolson and the Warner brothers were doing themselves. Jack Robin "compounds both tradition and stardom. The Warner Brothers thesis is that, really to succeed, a man must first acknowledge his ethnic self," argues W. T. Lhamon. "[T]he whole film builds toward the blacking-up scene at the dress rehearsal. Jack Robin needs the blackface mask as the agency of his compounded identity. Blackface will hold all the identities together without freezing them in a singular relationship or replacing their parts."

Seymour Stark's view is less sanguine. In describing Jolson's extensive experience performing in blackface in stage musicals, he asserts, "The immigrant Jew as Broadway star ... works within a blackface minstrel tradition that obscures his Jewish pedigree, but proclaims his white identity. Jolson's slight Yiddish accent was hidden by a Southern veneer." Arguing that The Jazz Singer actually avoids honestly dealing with the tension between American assimilation and Jewish identity, he claims that its "covert message ... is that the symbol of blackface provides the Jewish immigrant with the same rights and privileges accorded to earlier generations of European immigrants initiated into the rituals of the minstrel show."

Lisa Silberman Brenner contradicts this view. She returns to the intentions expressed by Samson Raphaelson, on whose play the film's script was closely based: "For Raphaelson, jazz is prayer, American style, and the blackface minstrel the new Jewish cantor. Based on the author's own words, the play is about blackface as a means for Jews to express a new kind of Jewishness, that of the modern American Jew." She observes that during the same period, the Jewish press was noting with pride that Jewish performers were adopting aspects of African American music.

According to Scott Eyman, the film "marks one of the few times Hollywood Jews allowed themselves to contemplate their own central cultural myth, and the conundrums that go with it. The Jazz Singer implicitly celebrates the ambition and drive needed to escape the shtetls of Europe and the ghettos of New York City, and the attendant hunger for recognition. Jack, Sam, and Harry [Warner] let Jack Robin have it all: the satisfaction of taking his father's place and of conquering the Winter Garden. They were, perhaps unwittingly, dramatizing some of their own ambivalence about the debt first-generation Americans owed their parents."

== Legacy ==
Three subsequent screen versions of The Jazz Singer have been produced: a 1952 remake, starring Danny Thomas and Peggy Lee; a 1959 television remake, starring Jerry Lewis; and a 1980 remake starring Neil Diamond, Lucie Arnaz, and Laurence Olivier. The Jazz Singer was adapted as a one-hour radio play on two broadcasts of Lux Radio Theatre, both starring Al Jolson, reprising his screen role. The first aired August 10, 1936; the second, also starring Gail Patrick, on June 2, 1947.

Disney made reference to the film, and its follow-up The Singing Fool, in the title of the 1929 Mickey Mouse short, The Jazz Fool. The Jazz Singer was parodied in the 1936 Warner Bros. cartoon I Love to Singa, directed by Tex Avery. Its hero is "Owl Jolson", a young owl who croons popular ditties, such as the title song, against the wishes of his father, a classical music teacher. Among the many references to The Jazz Singer in popular culture, perhaps the most significant is that of the MGM musical Singin' in the Rain (1952). The story, set in 1927, revolves around efforts to change a silent film production, The Dueling Cavalier, into a talking picture in response to The Jazz Singer's success. At one point Donald O'Connor's character suggests a new name for the now-musical, "I've got it! 'The Dueling Mammy'." The plot of The Simpsons episode "Like Father, Like Clown" (1991) parallels the tale of Jakie Rabinowitz/Jack Robin. Krusty the Clown's rabbi father disapproves of his son's choice to be a comedian, telling him, "You have brought shame on our family! Oh, if you were a musician or a jazz singer, this I could forgive."

According to film historian Krin Gabbard, The Jazz Singer "provides the basic narrative for the lives of jazz and popular musicians in the movies. If this argument means that sometime after 1959 the narrative must belong to pop rockers, it only proves the power of the original 1927 film to determine how Hollywood tells the stories of popular musicians." More broadly, he also suggests that this "seemingly unique film" has "become a paradigm for American success stories." More specifically, he examines a cycle of biopics of white jazz musicians stretching from Birth of the Blues (1941) to The Five Pennies (1959) that trace their roots to The Jazz Singer.

In 1996, The Jazz Singer was selected for preservation in the National Film Registry of "culturally, historically or aesthetically significant" motion pictures. In 1998, the film was chosen in voting conducted by the American Film Institute as one of the best American films of all time, ranking at number ninety. In 2007, a three-disc deluxe DVD edition of the film was released. The supplemental material includes Jolson's Vitaphone short, A Plantation Act (1926).

The phrase said by Al Jolson, "Wait a minute, wait a minute. You ain't heard nothin' yet!" was voted as the 71st best quote by the American Film Institute.

== Awards and nominations ==
Accolades for The Jazz Singer
Award	Category	Nominee(s)	Result
Academy Awards	Best Writing (Adaptation)	Alfred A. Cohn	Nominated
Academy Awards	Academy Honorary Award	Warner Bros. (Note: To Warner Bros. production chief Darryl F. Zanuck, for producing The Jazz Singer, the pioneer outstanding talking picture, which has revolutionized the industry.)	Won
National Film Preservation Board	National Film Registry		Inducted
Online Film & Television Association Awards	Hall of Fame – Motion Picture		Won

== See also ==
- List of early sound feature films (1926–1929)
- List of early Warner Bros. sound and talking features
- Till the Bells Ring – 1926 Scottish talking film
