= Bombo (musical) =

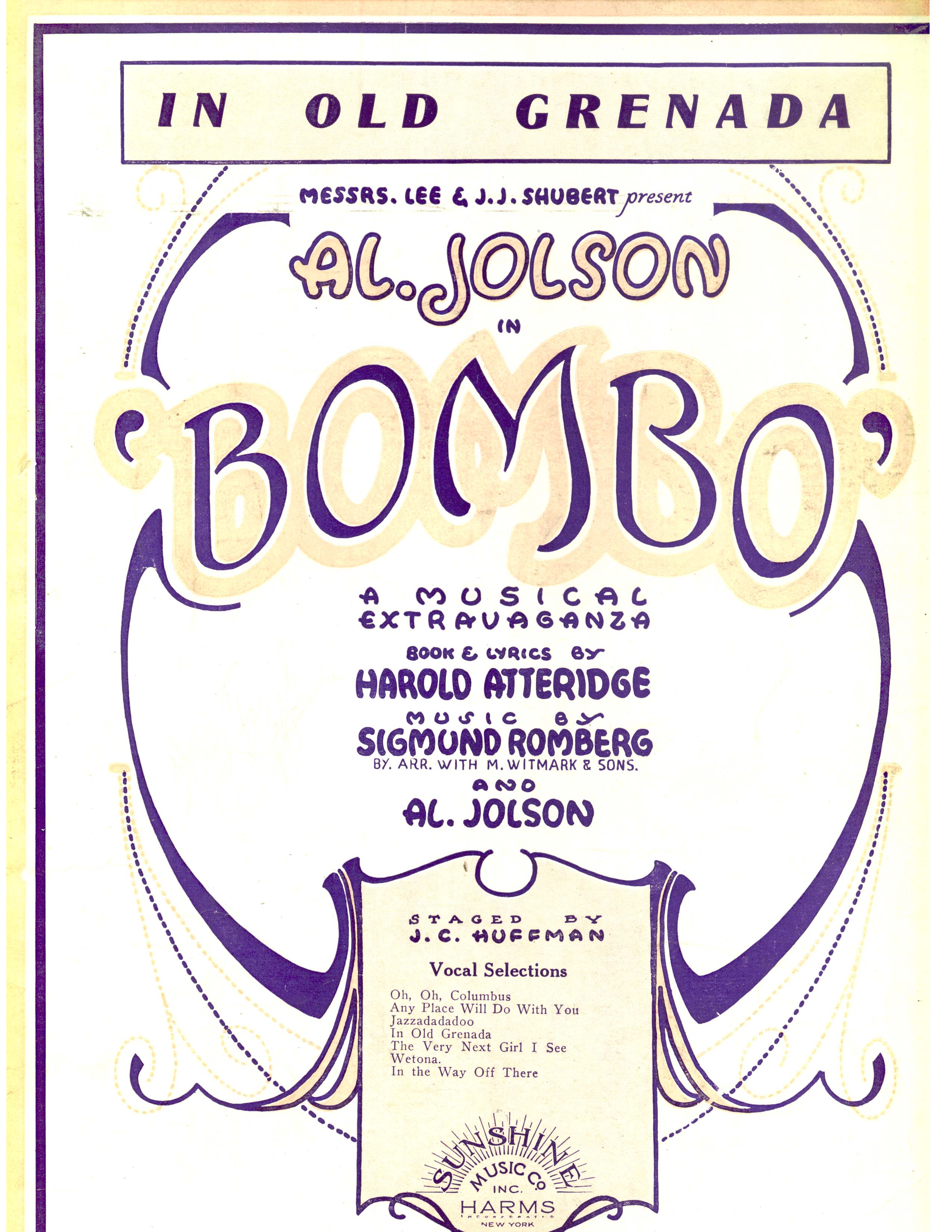
- Sheet music cover (cropped)
- Music: Sigmund Romberg
- Lyrics: Harold R. Atteridge
- Book: Harold R. Atteridge
- Productions: 1921 Broadway

Bombo is a Broadway musical with a book and lyrics by Harold Atteridge and music by Sigmund Romberg.

Produced by Lee Shubert and J. J. Shubert, the Broadway production, staged by J. C. Huffman, opened on October 6, 1921, at the Jolson's 59th Street Theatre, where it ran for 219 performances. The cast included Al Jolson and Janet Adair.

The musical has a thin story designed to showcase Jolson, who was at the height of his popularity. Songs were added by several composers during the run of the show so that, by the end of the run, there were more songs by composers other than Romberg than by him. The success of the musical on Broadway led to a national tour.

== Plot ==
- Setting: Genoa, Italy; Cordova, Spain; and San Salvador, El Salvador

Gus (played by Jolson in blackface) is a man living in Genoa, Italy in 1921 who finds himself transported back in time to Spain in 1492. Adopting the name "Bombo", Gus meets the explorer Christopher Columbus and becomes a slave whom Columbus brings along on his first voyage to the New World.

Al Jolson as Gus between Queen Isabella and Christopher Columbus in a scene from Bombo.

== Songs ==
- Any Place Will Do With You
- April Showers (words by B. G. de Sylva; music by Louis Silvers)
- Arcady (words & music by Jolson & DeSylva)
- The Barber In Seville (words and music by DeSylva and Jolson)
- Barefoot Days (by Al Wilson & Jas. A. Brennan)
- California, Here I Come (by Jolson, DeSylva & Joseph Meyer)
- Coo-Coo Song (words by Jolson and DeSylva)
- Dirty Hands, Dirty Face (lyric by Jolson, Grant Clarke & Edgar Leslie; music by James V. Monaco)
- Don't Cry, Swanee (by Jolson, DeSylva & Con Conrad)
- Don't Send Your Wife to the Country (words by DeSylva; music by Silvers)
- Down South (words by DeSylva; music by Walter Donaldson)
- Give Me My Mammy (words by DeSylva; music by Donaldson)
- I'm Goin’ South (words and music by Abner Silver and Harry Woods)
- In Old Granada
- In the Way Off There
- It's You (words by DeSylva; music by Silvers)
- Jazzadadadoo
- Koo-Kee-Koo (words by Kiang Zaney; music by Nacio Herb Brown)
- Last Night on the Back Porch (by Lew Brown & Carl Schraubstader)
- Morning Will Come (by Jolson, DeSylva & Conrad)
- Oh, Oh, Columbus
- Old Fashioned Girl (words and music by Jolson)
- Tallahassee (words by DeSylva; music by Silvers)
- Tell Me With Smiles (by Cliff Friend and Walter Hirsch)
- Toot, Toot, Tootsie (Goo’ Bye) (Words and music by Gus Kahn, Ernie Erdman & Dan Russo)
- The Very Next Girl I See
- Wetona
- Who Cares? (words by Jack Yellen; music by Milton Ager)
- Yoo-Hoo (lyrics by DeSylva; melody by Jolson)
