= Ottalie Mark =

American musicologist, copyright expert, songwriter and attorney

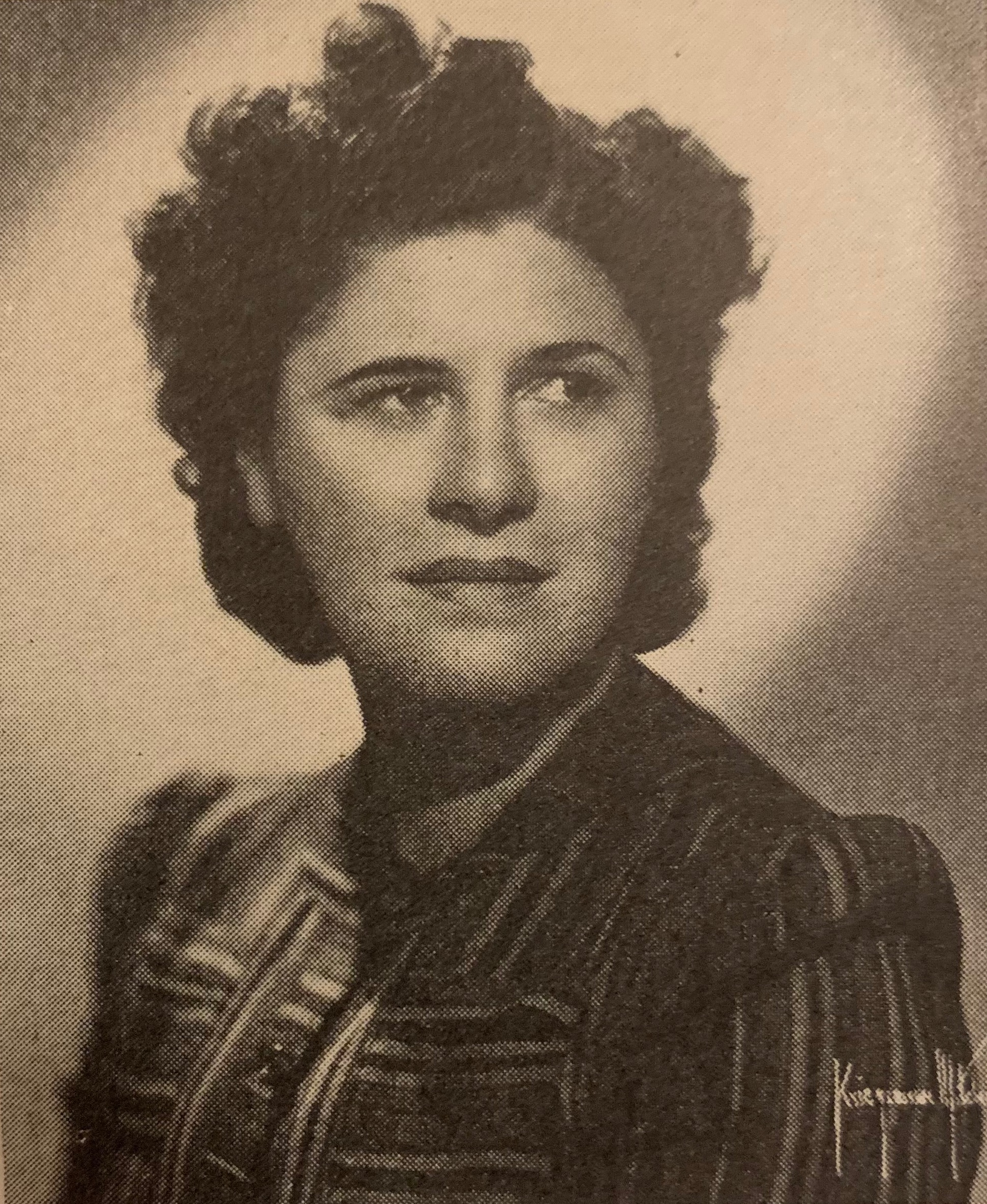
Ottalie Mark (mid-1930s)

Ottalie Mark (born Thilla Mark, October 3, 1896 - November 13, 1979) was an American musicologist, copyright consultant, composer, and music editor.

== Early life and education ==
Ottalie Mark was born on October 3, 1896, the daughter of Hyman David and Rose (née Glass) Mark, who immigrated to the United States from Lithuania in the 1880s. The family lived at 76 Chrystie Street on the Lower East Side of Manhattan, and her father worked in the garment industry. She was the eighth of nine children, four brothers and five sisters. She was brought up in an Orthodox Jewish household.

Mark was educated at Washington Irving Art School (a branch of the Wadleigh High School for Girls), and NY Prep School. She got her undergraduate degree from NYU in Pre-Law. She studied music with conductor Sunia Samuels and violinist Michael Sciapiro.

== Military service ==
In 1918, after graduating from college, Mark enrolled as a Yeoman Second Class in the Navy during World War I.

== Career ==
Mark's first job after military service was as secretary to Martha Wilchinski, Head of Publicity at Roxy Rothafel’s Capitol Theatre, in the early 1920s. She was also a cueing assistant to Ernö Rapée, the Capitol Theatre's Music Director. A "cueing assistant" is a person who works with an orchestra in a silent film theater, instructing the musicians on which cues to play during each scene. The cues are compiled from libraries of existing photoplay music purchased for use in each theater.

In the fall of 1925, she was hired as assistant to Herman Heller, the Warner Theatre's Music Director. She also assisted George Morris, the theater's head of publicity.

Mark knew that one of the ways Rothafel promoted events at the Capitol Theatre was through his weekly radio show, Roxy and His Gang, so she suggested that the Warner Theatre buy and install some used broadcasting equipment that was being sold by a tabloid newspaper called The New York Evening Graphic, to promote their events. The company already owned and operated LA-based station KFWB and used it to promote events on the west coast. They purchased the 500-watt Newark station WAAM from Ira Rogers Nelson. The new station, given the call letters WBPI (short for Warner Bros. Pictures Inc.), commenced broadcasting on December 29, 1925. The original Director of Programming was Frank Mallen, the former New York Evening Graphic night editor, but Mark was named Director of Programming in 1926.

On June 25, 1925 Warner Bros. Pictures entered into an exclusive partnership with Western Electric to bring their new sound-on-disc synchronization process, Vitaphone, to market, and Sam Warner put Herman Heller in charge of research and development. Heller hired composers Major Edward Bowes, Dr. William Axt, and David Mendoza to "compile" the score to the feature-length film Don Juan (in the silent film era, film scores were compiled from existing libraries of photoplay music). On August 5, 1926, Warner Bros. hosted a gala debut at their theater in New York to introduce Vitaphone to the public. The event was a success and put Warner Bros. Pictures at the forefront of the transition from the silent film era to the talking picture era.

On August 24, two weeks after the Vitaphone debut, The New York Times reported that ASCAP was pursuing claims of copyright infringement on behalf of publisher Robbins-Engel Music over the score for Don Juan. Axt had used two pieces that he'd previously composed for a silent film mood music library owned by Robbins-Engel, "The Fire Agitato" and "In Gloomy Forests," along with several pieces of European classical music that were still under copyright. One of the compositions Axt interpolated in the score for Don Juan was "Till Eulenspiegel's Merry Pranks," a tone poem by the German composer Richard Strauss. At the time of the event, the Warner Theatre had a valid ASCAP license for public performance, and had paid the statutory mechanical royalties for the Vitaphone discs containing the soundtrack audio, but they hadn't licensed the copyrighted compositions specifically for synchronization rights. The matter was settled out of court, and Heller assigned Mark to the task of creating a copyright research database for Warner Bros. Pictures to prevent further infringement claims. She set up an office in The Manhattan Opera House and began creating an index card system documenting songs' authorship and rights holder information. From then on, she handled all music library and synchronization rights-related matters for the company. In 1927, she and Heller handled administrative responsibilities related to the songs and score for the Warner Bros. film The Jazz Singer.

In December 1926, Western Electric's John E. Otterson was named chairman of a newly created subsidiary called Electrical Research Products Inc. (ERPI), established for the exploitation of all commercial patents outside of telephony. In order to make the Vitaphone system more appealing than the competing sound-on-film synchronization technologies being developed by RCA and others, Otterson negotiated a "blanket" deal for popular song rights with Edwin Claude Mills, head of the Music Publishers Protective Association (now known as the National Music Publishers' Association). This five-year agreement, which came to be known in the industry as The Mills Agreement, went into effect on September 5, 1927. It gave any film production company using Vitaphone synchronization rights to all songs controlled by MPPA publisher members, for an up-front financial guarantee recoupable against an annual per-seat tax. The added value of built-in synchronization rights made Vitaphone so appealing that, by 1928, Fox, Paramount, MGM, United Artists, Universal, Columbia, Hal Roach, and Christie were all using the equipment for soundtracking their films.

In the fall of 1929, Mark left Warner Bros. Pictures and moved to Hollywood to administer The Mills Agreement for ERPI. She was hired as Supervisor of Music Rights, working under Donald S. Pratt, head of the Music Rights Department. Most of the major studios were signatories to the agreement, so Mark was handling music synchronization clearances and cue sheet administration for the majority of Hollywood films that featured popular songs. Because the Mills Agreement was only valid in the US, she and Pratt began negotiations to expand it to include foreign territories and publishers. Mark personally trained business affairs representatives at each film studio to prepare ERPI-compliant cue sheets for film soundtracks utilizing popular music.

According to music publisher Isidore Witmark in his 1939 book The Story of the House of Witmark: From Ragtime to Swingtime, Mark was well-received by studio executives such as Irving Thalberg, and first implemented her services with Columbia Pictures president Harry Cohn and studio manager Samuel J. Briskin. Over the course of nearly a year, she standardized copyright procedures across the major studios while Donald Pratt established international ERPI copyright offices. Mark developed a centralized index-card filing system recording the copyright histories of hundreds of thousands of compositions—a database Witmark described as the first and most comprehensive synchronization rights archive in the world.Witmark, Isidore; Goldberg, Isaac (1939). The Story of the House of Witmark: From Ragtime to Swingtime. USA: Lee Furman Inc. pp. 426–427. ISBN 9781406707205.

On September 5, 1932, the Mills Agreement expired. The film industry had begun the transition away from sound-on-disc technology and was rapidly adopting sound-on-film as the standard for synchronization. Edwin Claude Mill's successor at the MPPA, John G. Paine, began structuring a new music rights "blanket" agreement that would not be tied to a specific equipment manufacturer, but it never materialized. The MPPA then began offering song rights negotiations for synchronization on a per-song basis. In September 1933, ERPI discontinued the music rights clearance department, and Mark moved back to New York. She set up an independent music rights consultancy called the Music Copyright Research Bureau in the RKO Building.

In 1939, the National Association of Broadcasters formed a new performing rights organization called Broadcast Music Incorporated as a lower cost alternative to ASCAP. They hired Mark as the first head of their Copyright Research Department. She compiled and maintained the copyright database, oversaw all song copyright ownership and rights-related research for broadcasters, sanctioned arrangements of public domain works, and handled infringement claims against BMI's songwriters.

In 1944, Mark enrolled at New York Law School and began studying for the bar exam. Three years later, she quit her job at BMI to focus full-time on passing the bar. In 1951, Mark established a copyright research consulting company in the Paramount Theatre building, servicing the book and music publishing, recording, broadcasting, television and motion picture industries with data and source material respecting copyrighted music and public domain music.

== Published articles ==
In 1936, Mark wrote an article entitled "By Special Permission of the Copyright Owner" in the trade magazine Musical Courier, on the history and evolution of music copyright. She also wrote an article entitled "Music Copyright Simplified" in the 1941 edition of Who is Who in Music, that explained music copyright law for the non-expert and clarified concepts related to intellectual property, both domestic and international.

== Personal life ==
Mark was Jewish. She married Philip F. Barbanell on March 20, 1943. Barbanell was a staff attorney for Paramount and RKO, and later went into private practice in New York. The couple shared office space and worked together in an entertainment law practice in the 1950s. She was also a composer and lyricist, writing at least sixteen published songs between the 1940s and the early 1970s.

On February 4, 1926, the Fort Myers Press published her recipe for chocolate meringue pie.

Her colleagues called her by the nicknames "Tilly" or "Ottie".
