= When a Man Loves =

1927 film by Alan Crosland

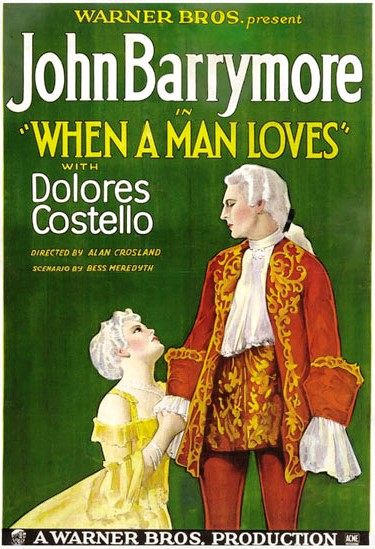
- Theatrical release poster
- Directed by: Alan Crosland
- Written by: Bess Meredyth (adaptation)
- Based on: Manon Lescaut (1731 novel) by Abbé Prévost
- Starring: John Barrymore; Dolores Costello
- Cinematography: Byron Haskin
- Edited by: Harold McCord
- Music by: Henry Hadley
- Production company: Warner Bros. Pictures
- Distributed by: Warner Bros. Pictures
- Release dates: February 3, 1927 (NYC); August 21, 1927 (US)
- Running time: 111 minutes
- Country: United States
- Languages: Sound (Synchronized) (English Intertitles)
- Budget: $528,000
- Box office: $1,037,000 (worldwide rentals)

When a Man Loves (1927)

When a Man Loves is a 1927 American synchronized sound historical drama film directed by Alan Crosland and produced and distributed by Warner Bros. While the film has no audible dialog, it was released with a synchronized musical score with sound effects using the Vitaphone sound-on-disc process. The picture stars John Barrymore and features Dolores Costello in the frequently filmed story of Abbé Prévost's 1731 novel Manon Lescaut. The lovers suffer, but the film has an optimistic ending, as they head to America. Manon dies at the end of the novel. The UK release title was His Lady.

The film was the third surviving feature from Warners to have a pre-recorded Vitaphone soundtrack.

== Plot ==
Chevalier Fabien des Grieux, who has forsworn the world for the church, falls passionately in love with young Manon Lescaut when he encounters her en route to a convent with her brother André. The lustful Comte Guillot de Morfontaine offers André a tempting sum for Manon, and learning of their bargain, Fabien takes her to Paris, where they spend an idyllic week in a garret. André finds her, persuades her to leave Fabien, and tries to force her into an alliance with Morfontaine—then rescues Manon from the advances of a brutal Apache. Fabien, crushed to believe that Manon has become Morfontaine's mistress, is about to take his vows but is deterred by her love for him. King Louis sees Manon in Richelieu's drawing room and wins her. The rejected Morfontaine orders her arrest and deportation, but he is killed by Fabien, who joins Manon on a convict ship bound for America. After inciting the convicts to mutiny, he escapes with her in a small boat. He points to the horizon and declares “Yonder—America! For us freedom—And everlasting love!”

== Cast ==
- John Barrymore as Chevalier Fabien des Grieux
- Dolores Costello as Manon Lescaut
- Warner Oland as André Lescaut
- Sam De Grasse as Comte Guillot de Morfontaine
- Holmes Herbert as Jean Tiberge
- Stuart Holmes as Louis XV, King of France
- Bertram Grassby as Le Duc de Richelieu
- Tom Santschi as Captain of convict boat
- Marcelle Corday as Marie, a servant
- Charles Clary as a lay brother
- Templar Saxe as Baron Chevral
- Eugenie Besserer as the landlady
- Rose Dione as Nana
- Noble Johnson as an Apache
- Tom Wilson as convict aboard the boat
- Myrna Loy as woman on ship

== Production ==
When a Man Loves re-teamed Barrymore and Costello after 1925's The Sea Beast. The film is the third and last film in Barrymore's first Warners contract, having been preceded by The Sea Beast and Don Juan. He and director Alan Crosland re-teamed at United Artists to make The Beloved Rogue, another French costume story that was selected because of the popularity of When a Man Loves. This film version of When a Man Loves repeats the ending of The Sea Beast, providing a happy ending rather than the tragic ending of the source material.

Many of the people who worked on the previous year's Don Juan worked on When a Man Loves, such as director Crosland, writer Bess Meredyth, editor Harold McCord, and director of photography Byron Haskin.

== Response ==
When the film played in the theater, the audience was amazed that the sound was coming from the speakers, not from an actual live orchestra. A New York Times reviewer wrote that he, and probably the rest of the audience, forgot the fact that there was actually no orchestra in the theater. At the end of the film, The Vitaphone Symphony Orchestra was shown to the audience for about 15 seconds.

=== Box office ===
According to Warner Bros. records, the film earned $732,000 in the U.S. and $305,000 in other markets.

== Premiere Vitaphone short subjects ==
When a Man Loves premiered at the Selwyn Theatre in New York City on February 3, 1927.

Title	Year
Quartette from "Rigoletto"	1927
Van and Schenck "The Pennant Winning Battery of Songland"	1927
Charles Hackett of the Chicago Opera Company Sings "Questa o quella" and "La donna è mobile" from "Rigoletto"	1927

== Home media ==
On June 16, 2009, When a Man Loves was released on DVD from Warner's Archive Collection. This was the film's first home video appearance.

== Other film versions ==
- Manon Lescaut (1914)
- Manon Lescaut (1926)
- Manon Lescaut (1940)

== See also ==
- List of early sound feature films (1926–1929)
- List of early Warner Bros. sound and talking features
- John Barrymore filmography
