= Danny Russo =

Dan Russo
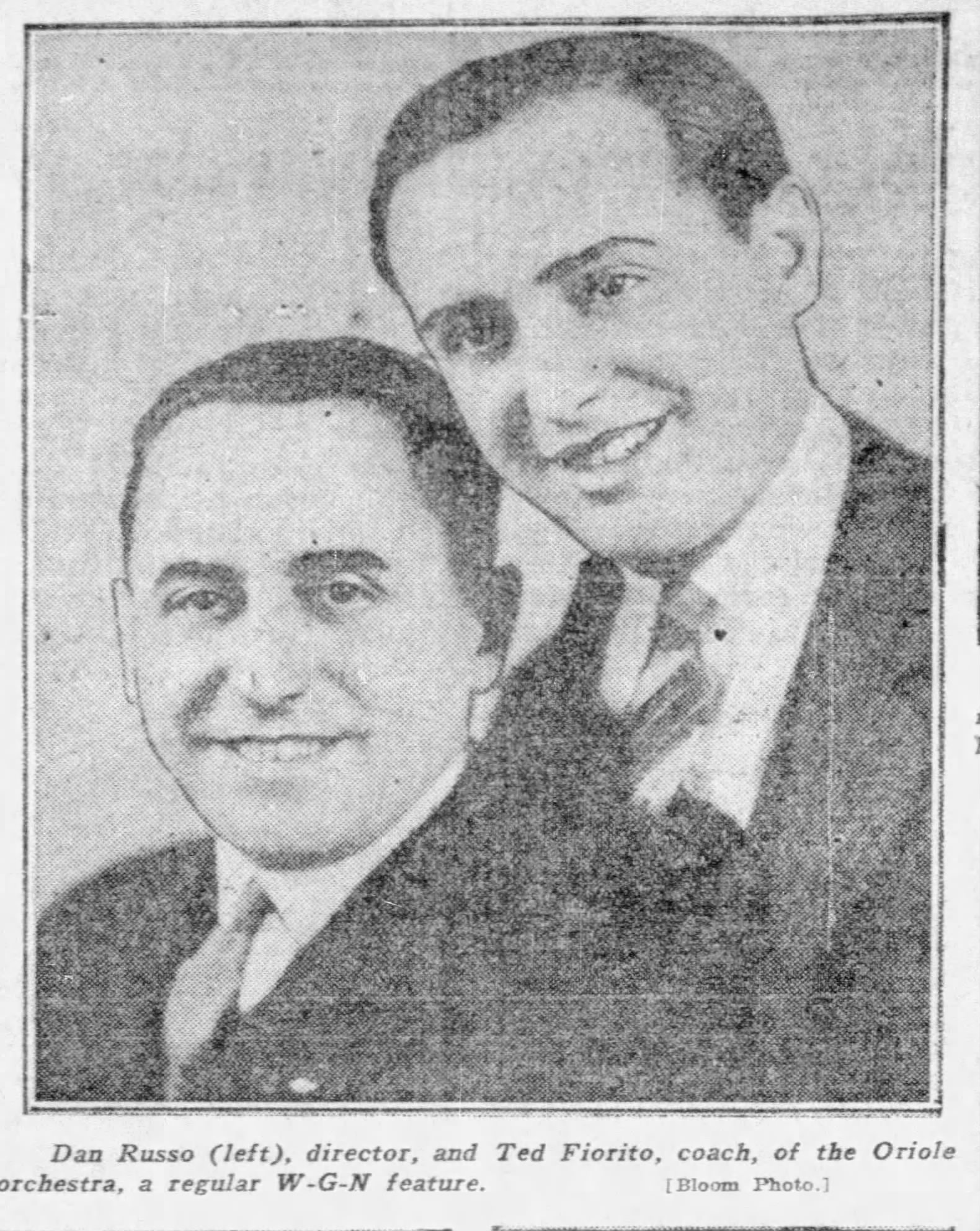
- Russo (left) with Fiorito in 1924 as the Oriole Orchestra.

Background information
- Born: Chicago, Illinois, United States
- Died: September 5, 1956 (aged 70) Hollywood, California, United States
- Genres: Jazz, big band
- Occupations: Songwriter, violinist

Dan Russo (Chicago, 13 October 1885 — Hollywood, 5 September 1956) was an American violinist, songwriter, and big band leader during the 1920s and 1930s.

Russo assembled his first orchestra in Chicago at the beginning of the 1920s, which had an engagement at the Oriole Terrace in Detroit. This group was conducted together with the pianist Ted Fiorito, and became known under the name of the Oriole Orchestra, also performing at the Chicago Edgewater Beach Hotel. These performances were also broadcast on the radio in 1924. In 1926 they opened an engagement at the Aragon Ballroom. The orchestra consisted of three saxophonists, two trumpets, a trombone, a piano, a tuba, a banjo, drums, and Russo on the violin. Russo's orchestra was a well-known territory band in Chicago and the Midwest; Some recordings were made for the labels Columbia and Brunswick under the band names The Oriole Terrace Orchestra and Russo & Fiorito's Oriole Orchestra. In 1927, Fiorito and Russo parted, and each continued his own band; Russo took over the old band name for recordings until 1932.

Dan Russo also worked on the song "Toot, Toot, Tootsie (Goo' Bye!)", which he wrote with Gus Kahn and Ernie Erdman. It was played by Al Jolson & the Vitaphone Orchestra and was used on the soundtrack of Woody Allen's Bullets over Broadway (1994).
