= The Happy Six =

The Happy Six was an early jazz band, one of several outfits managed by Harry Yerkes. The made numerous recordings for Columbia Records, many of which were commercial and artistic successes.

The Happy Six recorded between from 1919 to 1923. Alcide Nunez recorded as a member of the group from 1919 to 1920. Another musician from New Orleans, Tom Brown, was a prominent member. Other members included Phil Ohman and George Hamilton Green. Some of the recordings feature Ted Fiorito on piano. Jack Kaufman occasionally provided vocal choruses. The group's music reflects its mix of New-Orleans' jazzmen and classically trained musicians. The results range from traditional jazz to pop, and as such the group has been called an early experiment in jazz fusion.

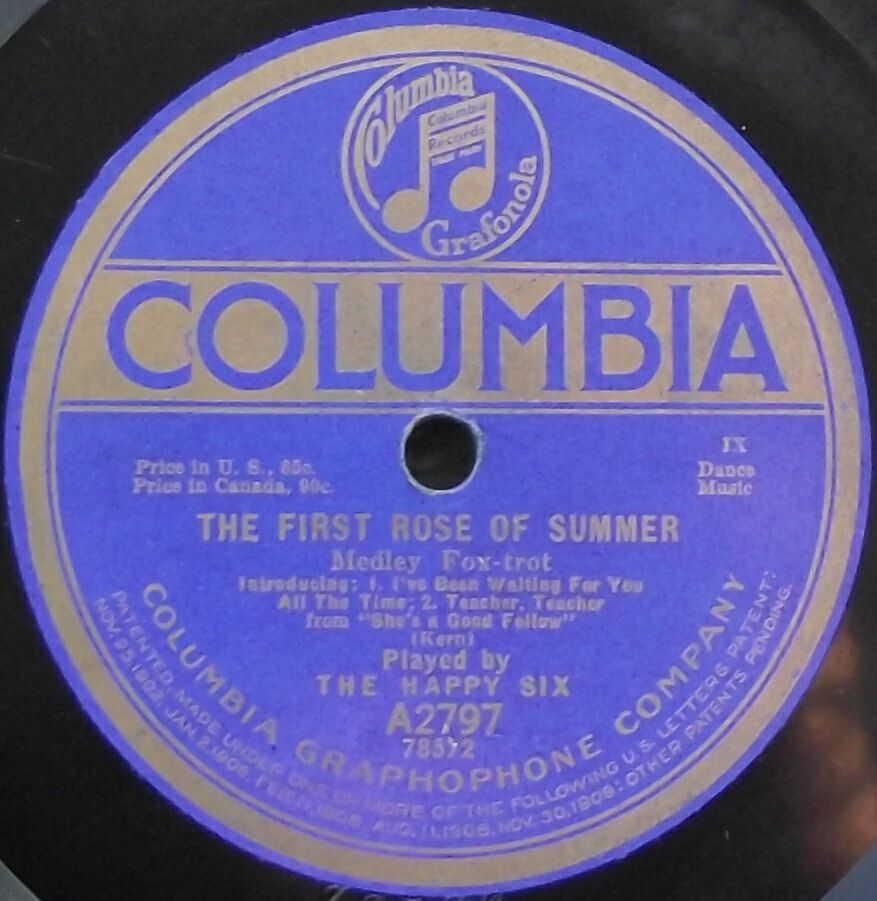
Columbia A2797 by The Happy Six

The Happy Six released more than 80 sides on Columbia. Their best selling recordings were:

- Do You Ever Think of Me
- Down Yonder
- My Sahara Rose

Other recordings which have received critical attention are:

- Behind Your Silken Veil
- Grieving for You
- My Little Bimbo Down on the Bamboo Isle

A reissue of material by The Happy Six by Rivermont Records featuring liner notes by Mark Berresford was nominated for Best Album Notes at the 2010 Grammys.
