= Ted Fio Rito =

American composer, orchestra leader, and keyboardist (1900-1971)

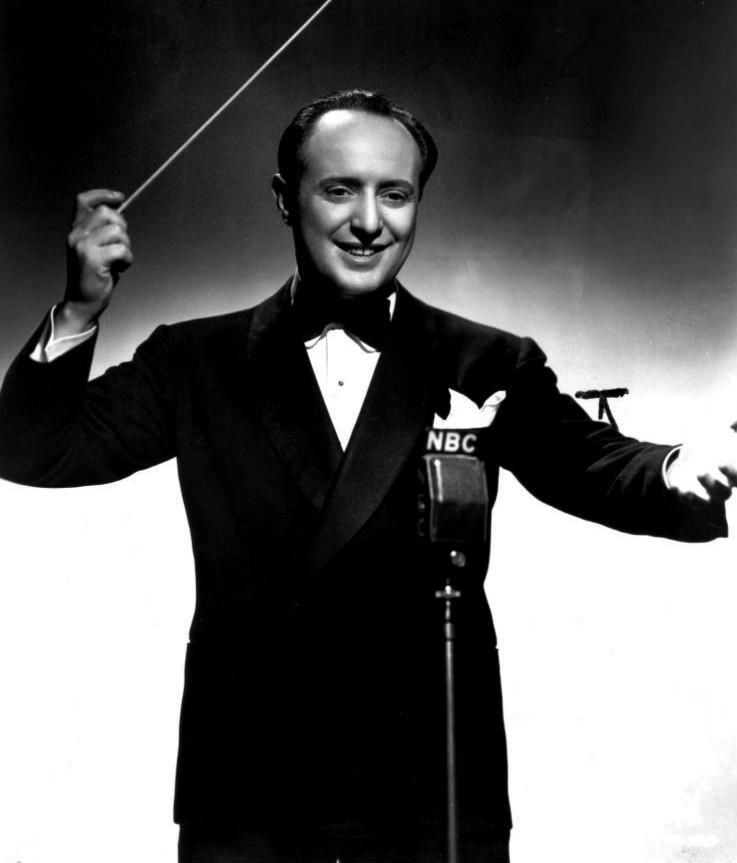

Background information
- Born: Theodore Salvatore Fiorito; December 20, 1900; Newark, New Jersey, U.S.
- Died: July 22, 1971 (aged 70) Scottsdale, Arizona, U.S.
- Occupations: Bandleader, composer, musician, keyboardist
- Instruments: Piano, organ
- Years active: 1919-1971

Theodore Salvatore Fiorito (December 20, 1900 – July 22, 1971), known professionally as Ted Fio Rito, was an American composer, orchestra leader, and keyboardist, on both the piano and the Hammond organ, who was popular on American national radio broadcasts in the 1920s and 1930s. His name is sometimes written as Ted Fiorito or Ted FioRito.

== Biography ==
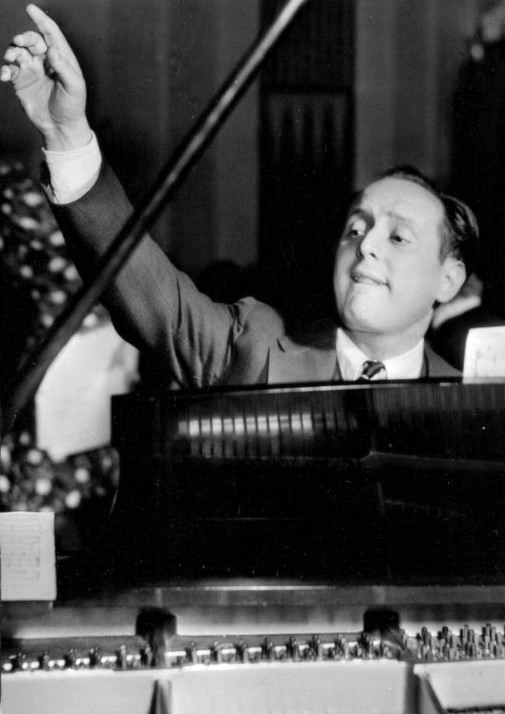
Fio Rito on the air with Clara, Lu, and Em, 1936. He led his band while playing the piano.

He was born Teodorico Salvatore Fiorito in Newark, New Jersey to an Italian immigrant couple, tailor Louis (Luigi) Fiorito and Eugenia Cantalupo Fiorito, when they were both 21 years old; and he was delivered by a midwife at their 293 15th Avenue residence. Ted Fiorito attended Barringer High School in Newark. In Italy, his mother had sung light opera.

He was still in his teens when he landed a job in 1919 as a pianist at Columbia's New York City recording studio, working with the Harry Yerkes bands—the Yerkes Novelty Five, Yerkes' Jazarimba Orchestra and The Happy Six. His earliest compositions were recorded by the Yerkes groups and Art Hickman's band. Fio Rito had numerous hit recordings, notably his two number one hits, "My Little Grass Shack in Kealakekua, Hawaii" (1934) and "I'll String Along with You" (1934).

He also demonstrated piano music for Al Piantadosi, who was part of the Tin Pan Alley.

He composed more than 100 songs, collaborating with such lyricists as Ernie Erdman, Gus Kahn, Sam Lewis, Cecil Mack, Albert Von Tilzer, and Joe Young.

He moved to Chicago, Illinois, in 1921 to join Dan Russo's band, and the following year he was the co-leader of Russo and Fio Rito's Oriole Orchestra. When Russo and Fio Rito opened at Detroit, Michigan's Oriole Terrace, their band was renamed the Oriole Terrace Orchestra. Their first recordings (May 1922) included Fio Rito's "Soothing." He did "Sleep" and other tunes for the AMPICO Reproducing Piano.

== Radio remotes ==
The band returned to Chicago for a booking at the Edgewater Beach Hotel, where they did their first radio remote broadcast on March 29, 1924. The band had a four-year engagement at the hotel. Contralto Harriet Lee frequently sang off-stage with some of the band's numbers, unseen by the audience.

In August 1925, the Russo-Fio Rito orchestra opened Chicago's new Uptown Theatre. They opened the famous Aragon Ballroom in July 1926, doing radio remotes nationally from both the Aragon and the Trianon Ballrooms. In 1927, he had a radio program on KTHS in Hot Springs, Arkansas. Dan Russo left the band in 1928, and Fio Rito took over as leader, touring the midwest with engagements in St. Louis, Kansas City and Cincinnati.

In August 1929, the band's first recording without Russo featured Ted Lewis on clarinet and vocal. Billed as Ted Fio Rito and His Edgewater Beach Hotel Orchestra, they headed for San Francisco to fill in for the Anson Weeks orchestra at the Mark Hopkins Hotel.

=== Radio in the 1930s ===
Fio Rito reached a national audience through syndicated and network radio programs. In Chicago, the band was heard on the Brunswick Brevities program, and they were the featured orchestra on NBC's Skelly Gasoline Show in New York. They broadcast on many 1930s radio programs, including The Old Gold Hour, Hollywood Hotel, The Al Jolson Show, Frigidaire Frolics and Clara, Lu, and Em.

The Fio Rito Orchestra's vocalists included Jimmy Baxter, Candy Candido, the Debutantes, Betty Grable, June Haver, the Mahoney Sisters, Muzzy Marcellino, Joy Lane (1947–1951), Billy Murray ("the Denver Nightingale"), Maureen O’Connor, Patti Palmer (born Esther Calonico), Kay and Ward Swingle.

During the 1940s, the band's popularity diminished, but Fio Rito continued to perform in Chicago and Arizona. He played in Las Vegas during the 1960s. In his last years, he led a small combo at venues throughout California and Nevada until his death in Scottsdale, Arizona, from a heart attack. He is buried in the San Fernando Mission Cemetery in the Mission Hills community of northern Los Angeles.

Details of his chart successes are given below.

== Recordings ==
The Fiorito Band recorded prolifically starting in 1929 for Columbia. He signed with Victor from 1929 to 1930. After a single session in 1930 for Hit Of The Week, he signed with Brunswick in 1932 and recorded scores of records through 1935, when he signed with Decca from 1936 to 1942. He did a single session for Victor's Bluebird label in 1940. From 1932 through the 1942 recording ban, he primarily recorded in San Francisco and Los Angeles (most of his pre-1932 were recorded in Chicago).

== Motion picture career ==
- The short animation Oh Mabel (1924), made in the sound-on-film Phonofilm process, featured the song "Oh, Mabel!" by Fio Rito and Gus Kahn.
- Fio Rito appeared as himself, with his orchestra, in a number of motion pictures during the 1930s and early 1940s. He and his orchestra were featured in the films: Twenty Million Sweethearts (1934), What Price Jazz? (1934), Broadway Gondolier (1935), Rhythm Parade (1942) and Chasin' the Blues (1942).

== References in popular culture ==
Fio Rito is mentioned in The Honeymooners episode, "Young at Heart", that aired February 11, 1956. Reminiscing about bands from their youth, Ralph Kramden (Jackie Gleason) and Ed Norton (Art Carney) recall, in addition to Fio Rito, Isham Jones, Basil Fomeen, Jack Little, and "Johnny Messner and his toy piano".

His Cocoanut Grove Ambassadors radio broadcast rendition of "This Is Romance" is sampled throughout the Post-Awareness stages of Everywhere At The End Of Time, most prominently in the track "Q1 - Long decline is over", with various sections from the second half of the song being used throughout the album.

== Chart successes ==
Year	Song	Peak chart position
1932	Willow Weep for Me	17
1933	(When It's) Darkness on the Delta	12
1933	I'll Take an Option on You	7
1933	I Don't Stand a Ghost of a Chance with You	12
1933	Hold Me	12
1934	My Little Grass Shack in Kealakekua, Hawaii	1
1934	Temptation	15
1934	I'll String Along with You	1
1934	Soft Green Seas	12
1934	King Kamahamena (Conqueror of the Islands)	10
1934	June in January	10
1935	On the Good Ship Lollipop	16
1936	Let's Face the Music and Dance	9
1936	All My Life	15
1937	Tomorrow Is Another Day	10
1937	Vieni, Vieni	17
1939	How Strange	16

== Other songs and recordings ==
- "Maybe"
- "Sunshine of Mine"
- "There's Yes, Yes in Your Eyes"
- "That Lullaby Strain"
- "Toot, Toot, Tootsie (Goo'bye)"
- "Charley, My Boy"
- "Alone at Last"
- "No, No Nora"
- "When Lights Are Low"
- "Sometime"
- "I Never Knew (That Roses Grew)"
- "Drifting Apart"
- "Laugh, Clown, Laugh"
- "King for a Day"
- "Then You've Never Been Blue"
- "Now That You're Gone"
- "Three on a Match"
- "Kalua Lullaby"
- "I Want Somebody to Cheer Me Up"
- "I'm Sorry Sally"
- "Nothing on My Mind"
- "When the Moon Hangs High"
- "Roll Along, Prairie Moon"
- "Alone at a Table for Two"
- "Yours Truly"
- "Lily of Laguna"

== Listen to ==
- "Boogie Woogie Lullaby," remote from the Naval Air Station at Banana River, Florida (August 1945)
- "Charley, My Boy": Ted Fio Rito Orchestra with Billy Murray vocal (1924)
- "Night in Manhattan": Ted Fio Rito Orchestra with Muzzy Marcellino vocal
