= Introduction of Vitaphone Sound Pictures =

1926 film with Will H. Hays

- Starring: Will H. Hays
- Distributed by: Warner Bros.
- Release date: August 5, 1926
- Running time: 4 minutes
- Country: United States
- Language: English

Introduction of Vitaphone Sound Pictures is a 1926 Vitaphone short film released by Warner Bros. Pictures, Inc. on August 5, 1926, a Thursday evening. It was one of the first talking films. It introduced Warner's new Vitaphone sound-on-disc sound system.

== Premise ==
Introduction to the Vitaphone sound-on-disc system by Will H. Hays (August 5, 1926)

Will H. Hays, President of the Motion Picture Producers and Distributors of America, introduces the audience to the Vitaphone sound system and muses on the possibilities of the technological advancement. This short played with a grouping of other shorts at the world premiere of Don Juan, the first feature film to employ Vitaphone. In the short film, Hays states:

It has been said that the art of vocalists and instrumentalists is ephemeral, that he creates but for the moment. Now neither the artist nor his art will ever wholly die.
