= Toot, Toot, Tootsie (Goo' Bye!) =

1922 song

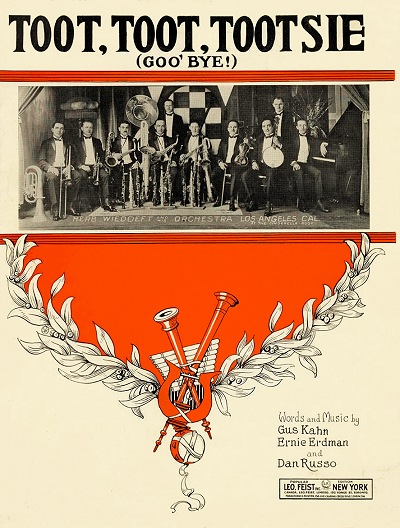
- Sheet music cover, 1922

Song
- Published: 1922 by Leo Feist, Inc.
- Songwriters: Gus Kahn; Ernie Erdman; Danny Russo

Toot, Toot, Tootsie (Goo' Bye!) is a 1922 song with music and lyrics by Gus Kahn, Ernie Erdman and Danny Russo, per the credits on the original sheet music cover. Some other sources also credit Ted Fio Rito and Robert King for the song, but make no mention of Dan Russo. It debuted in the Broadway musical Bombo, where it was a major hit. It was first recorded by Al Jolson with Frank Crumit's orchestra for Columbia Records on September 9, 1922. It was further popularised by the racy singer-comedian Eddie Cantor.

This song has become associated with the age and image of the flapper during the Roaring Twenties. While the Jolson version was the most popular, other high-selling versions in 1923 were those by Ernest Hare & Billy Jones, Vincent Lopez, and Benson Orchestra of Chicago.

"Toot, Toot, Tootsie" appeared in the films The Jazz Singer (1927), Rose of Washington Square (1939), The Jolson Story (1946), I'll See You in My Dreams (1951), Goodfellas (1990), and Remains to Be Seen (1953). Also, the Kansas City R&B band Bloodstone performed "Toot, Toot, Tootsie" in their 1975 movie Train Ride to Hollywood.

It was also performed in "Aunt Bee's Medicine Man" episode of The Andy Griffith Show , the Beatles' film, Magical Mystery Tour, the fifth episode of The Brady Bunch Hour and the eleventh episode of season 4 of Gimme a Break!.

Other artists who recorded the song include Billy Murray together with Ed Smalle; Hoosier Hot Shots, Art Mooney, Eddy Howard, Wayne Newton, Jerry Vale, Brenda Lee, and Jack Mudurian.

== See also ==
- List of train songs
