= Janet Adair =

20th-century American vaudeville, ragtime, musical performer(1892 - 1938)

- Born: c. 1892; St. Louis, Missouri, U.S.
- Died: November 24, 1938 (aged 45–46); Beverly Hills, California, U.S.
- Occupation: Actress

Janet Adair (c. 1892 – 24 November 1938) was an American vaudeville, ragtime, musical revue and musical comedy performer in the early twentieth century, who also appeared in five movies.

== Biography ==
Adair was born in St. Louis, Missouri, in about 1892. She worked as a stenographer in that city until, during a party in 1910 to celebrate her eighteenth birthday, she reportedly accepted a dare to perform her character songs on stage. She was quickly engaged by St. Louis theatre manager Dan Fishell, and performed at moving picture theatres and in vaudeville shows in Missouri and nearby states, including Kentucky, Texas, Michigan, and Arkansas. She performed with accompanists Hazel Hickey (until 1914) and Emily or Emma Adelphi (later Mrs Jack Norworth) (from 1916). She toured nationally and to Canada, and frequently headlined variety shows.

Reviewers described Adair as "one of those few who have the singular attraction of personality combined with voice and action .. truly a comedienne"; "Diminutive and childlike Miss Adair "puts over" her songs in a fashion that is irresistible"; "an excellent imitator"; "an irresistibly fascinating adorably clever young lady ... [with] the atmosphere about her that gets right over the footlights ... Some call it personality, and others call it pep; but whatever it is, she has it in carload lots." Her songs, which she called "song definitions", were described as "satires of various personages easily recognizable .. clever jabs at certain phases of domestic and social life".

During 1919–1920, she appeared in the Shubert Gaieties of 1919.

She was a contralto member of the D'Oyly Carte Opera Company's choir from August to December 1926.

== Personal life ==
Adair married vaudeville comedian James "Fat" Thompson in 1914. In 1915, she was seriously ill after giving birth to a son who died within hours. She married movie composer Louis Silvers in 1924. She died on November 24, 1938, at the Santa Monica Hospital, California, reportedly from an overdose of sleeping tablets taken after she had spent twelve hours preparing her home in Pacific Palisades for a quick flight from a forest fire that destroyed 600-800 properties.

== Filmography ==
- Finders Keepers (1929; written by George Kelly)
- The Flattering Word (1929; written by George Kelly)
- Here Comes the Bridesmaid (1928)
- The Mikado (1926)
- The Crooked Dagger (1919)

== Selected stage performances ==
- Bombo (1921-1922)
- Shubert Gaieties of 1919 (1919–1920)
