= Dirty Hands, Dirty Face =

1921 song from the musical '"Bombo"

"Dirty Hands! Dirty Face!"
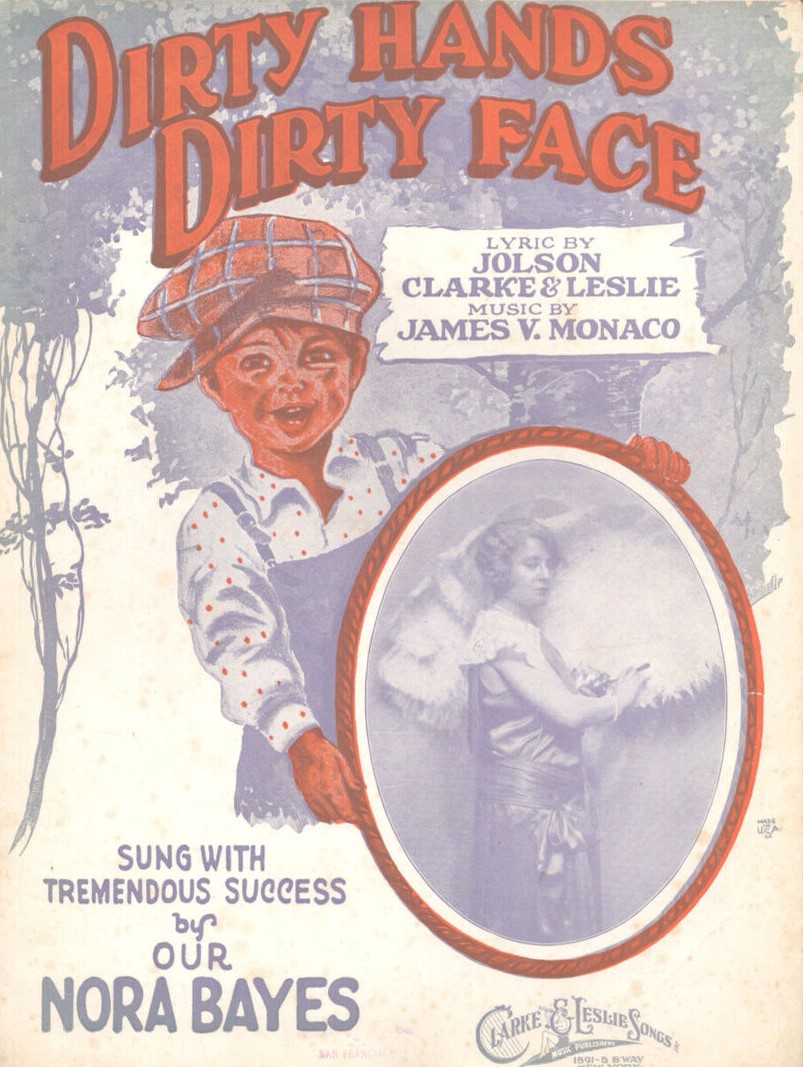
- Sheet music cover featuring Nora Bayes, 1921

Single by Al Jolson with Abe Lyman's California Orchestra
- A-side: "My Mammy"
- Released: 1928
- Recorded: 31 March 1928
- Genre: Pop
- Label: Brunswick; 3912
- Songwriters: Al Jolson, Grant Clarke, Edgar Leslie, James V. Monaco

Al Jolson with Abe Lyman's California Orchestra singles chronology
"Mother of Mine, I Still Love You" (1927)	"Dirty Hands! Dirty Face!" (1928)	"Ol' Man River" (1928)

"Dirty Hands, Dirty Face" (or "Dirty Hands! Dirty Face!") is a song from the 1921 musical Bombo. The lyrics were written by Grant Clarke and Edgar Leslie; with music by James V. Monaco. Al Jolson is often credited as a lyricist; it was common for popular performers to take a cut of the popularity of a song by being listed as a lyricist. The song is about the love that a father has for his son.

== Jolson version ==
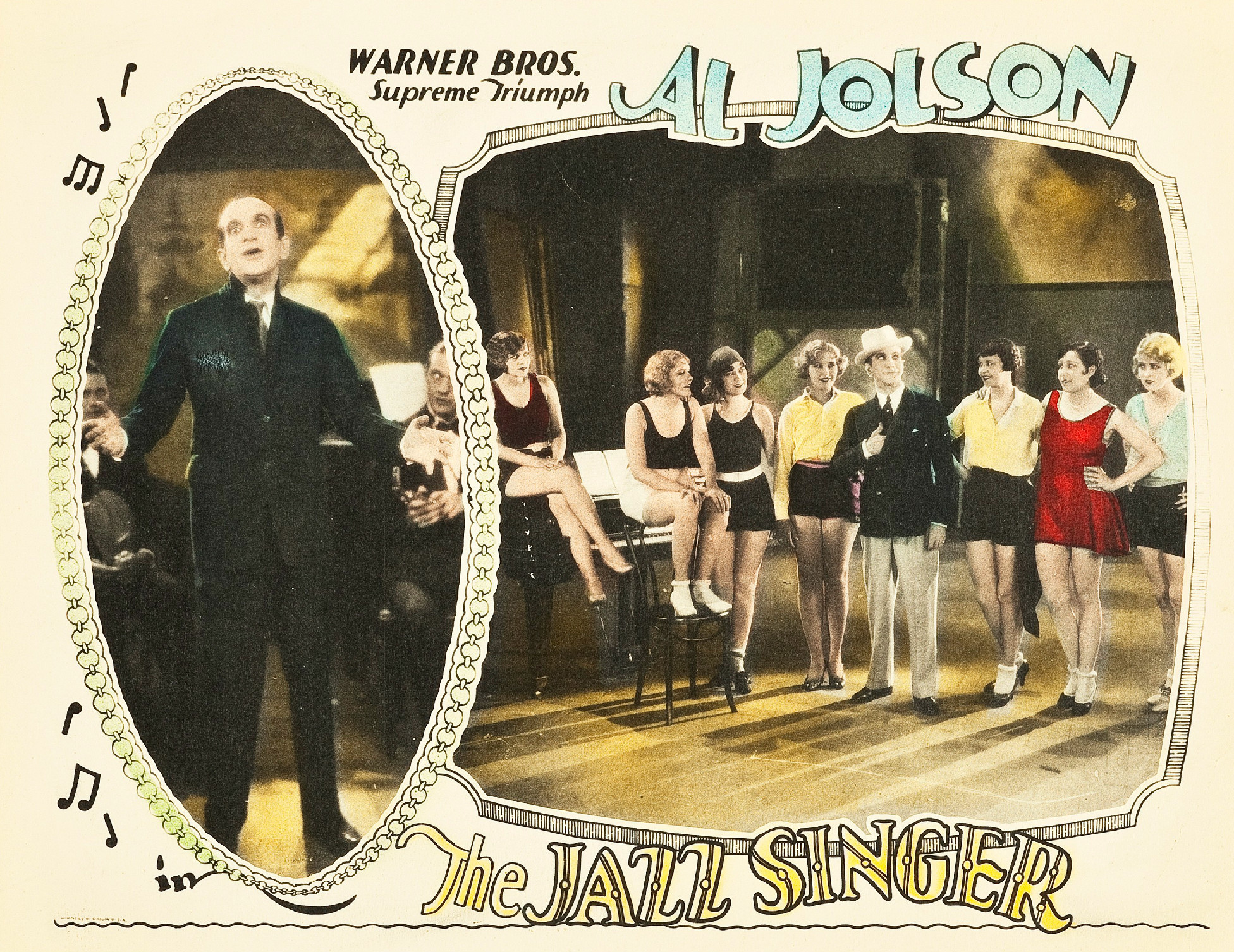
A lobby card for The Jazz Singer

Jolson performs the song in the 1927 film The Jazz Singer in character as Jack Robin (formerly Jakie Rabinowitz). The film concerns the attempt of Jolson's character to become a vaudeville performer against opposition from his religious Jewish family. It was the film's second musical number, and occurs 18 minutes into the film in a scene at Coffee Dan's nightclub in San Francisco. Jolson subsequently recorded the song in March 1928. Gerald R. Butters in his 2002 book Black Manhood on the Silent Screen wrote that "the symbolic link with blackface (dirtiness) is obvious"; the film later featured Jolson wearing blackface. After he sings the song Jolson responds to the audience's applause by saying in improvised dialogue, "Wait a minute. Wait a minute. You ain't heard nothing yet" a phrase he often said in his vaudeville performances. Jolson's words were the first words spoken on camera in a feature film. Michael Rogin describes them as "These first words of feature movie speech, a kind of per-formative, announce-you ain't heard nothing yet-the birth of sound movies and the death of silent film". Rogin wrote in the journal Critical Inquiry in 1992 that "The "desire" that carries forward this "interiorized, moralized" oedipal narrative...is Jack's "innocent and dirty" desire-sung as "Dirty Hands, Dirty Face" to become a histrionic, vaudeville performer". The "innocent and dirty" quote was derived from the writings of Pascal Bonitzer.

Jolson's performance of the song was extensively analysed in the 2005 book Style and Meaning: Studies in the Detailed Analysis of Film, with "Dirty Hands, Dirty Face" being perceived as "an extraordinary revelation of the entire narrative structure of the film".

== Other recordings ==
It was recorded in August 1923 by Isabella Patricola with the Ben Selvin Orchestra. Selvin also recorded a version with Irving Kaufman. Judy Garland recorded it with an arrangement by Nelson Riddle for her 1957 album Judy. Garland's version was described as "corny...inspired by, yet also transcending, Jolson's style". She also performed it for an April 1956 episode of General Electric Theater on CBS and the 23rd episode of her CBS television show, taped in February 1964.
