= Grant Clarke =

American songwriter (1891–1931)

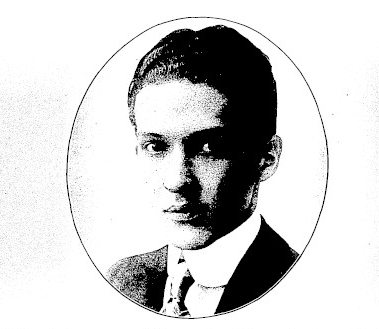
- Grant Clarke, 1918

Background information
- Born: May 14, 1891; Akron, Ohio, United States
- Died: May 16, 1931 (aged 40) California, United States
- Occupations: Composer, songwriter

Grant Clarke (May 14, 1891, Akron, Ohio – May 16, 1931, California) was an American songwriter.

Clarke moved to New York City early in his career, where he worked as an actor and a staff writer for comedians. He began working on Tin Pan Alley, where he contributed music to films such as The Jazz Singer (1927), Weary River (1928), On with the Show! (1929) and Is Everybody Happy? (1929).

He wrote the lyrics to the show Dixie to Broadway, and also contributed to the 1921 Ziegfeld Follies and Bombo. Later in his career he became a charter member of ASCAP and was successful in the music publishing business.

Clarke was the author of the lyrics to many popular songs of the 1910s and 1920s, among them "Second Hand Rose" and "Am I Blue?", working with composers such as George W. Meyer, Harry Akst, James V. Monaco, Al Piantadosi, Fred Fisher, Harry Warren, Arthur Johnston, James Hanley, Lewis F. Muir and Milton Ager.

== Selected songs ==
"Ragtime Cowboy Joe", which Clarke co-wrote with Lewis F. Muir

A list of Clarke's most prominent works:

- "Dat's Harmony" (1911)
- "Ragtime Cowboy Joe" (1912)
- "He'd Have to Get Under – Get Out and Get Under" (1913)
- "When You're in Love With Someone" (1915)
- "You're A Dangerous Girl" (1916)
- "In the Land of Beginning Again" (1918)
- "Everything is Peaches Down in Georgia" (1918)
- "Second Hand Rose" (1921)
- "Oogie Oogie Wa Wa" (1922)
- "Dirty Hands, Dirty Face" (1921)
- "I'm a Little Blackbird Looking for a Bluebird" (1924)
- "Am I Blue?" (1929)
