= Harry Yerkes =

American marimba player (1872–1954)

Harry A. Yerkes
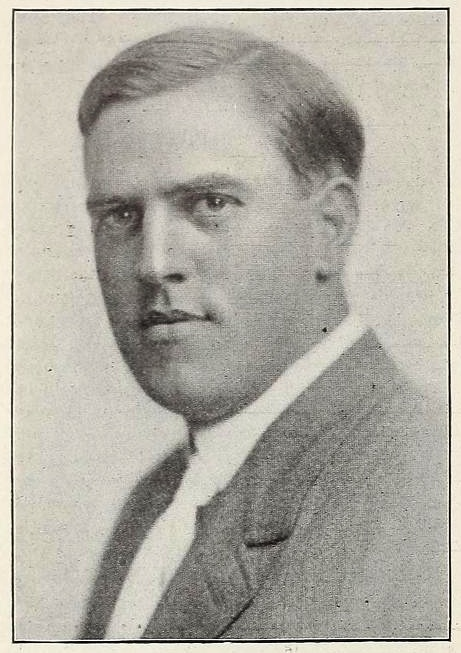

Background information
- Born: 18 August 1872; Brooklyn, New York
- Died: 24 December 1954 (aged 82) New York
- Genres: popular, jazz
- Occupation(s): instrumentalist, inventor, record executive
- Years active: 1905–1920s
- Labels: Columbia Records, Vocalion Records, others

Harry A. Yerkes (18 August 1872 – 24 December 1954) was a marimba player, inventor, and recording manager who assembled many recording sessions in the early years of jazz. Many of the sessions organized by Yerkes used his name for the artist credit, including Yerkes' Jazarimba Orchestra and Yerkes' Marimbaphone Band on Columbia Records, which are estimated to have some of the best selling records of 1919 and 1921.

== Biography ==
Yerkes began his recording career in 1906, performing on the xylophone. He founded the Yerkes Sound-Effects Company, which developed and marketed a pneumatic system to play chimes, featured in the Woolworth Building at time of construction. Yerkes joined the Betts & Betts company in 1915, and manufacture of his chime and bells mechanisms was transferred to that company. From 1917 until 1924 he was active as a recording contractor and manager for various dance bands. These groups often included his name, though he was not often an active contributor, musically. He was in charge of a group known as the Yerkes' Novelty Five (sometimes credited to "Novelty Five") which recorded for Vocalion Records. He subsequently was involved in The Happy Six, the Columbia Saxophone Sextette, who produced jazz-tinged records prolifically, both again for Columbia Records, and what is probably the musical group he is most associated with, Yerkes' S. S. Flotilla Orchestra. In 1924 he founded his own record label, Yerkes Dance Records. Other labels Yerkes' outfits appeared on include Edison, Gennett, Grey Gull, and Lyric. In 1918 he became an executive at Columbia Records, first as a "field manager", which duties corresponded roughly to that of a talent scout, and then as assistant to Columbia vice-president H. L. Wilson. He resigned this post in 1925. His final recordings as a solo artist were made in 1923.

== Style and influence ==
Most of Yerkes' recordings have limited, if any, jazz content in the modern sense. Some of the performances of Yerkes' groups may be better classified as light classical, but many performances are an important link between ragtime and early, "rudimentary" jazz. However, he was among the early proponents of jazz as a serious form of art. He was also a proponent of blues music, and was a key figure in producing a concert at Aeolian Hall which debuted a symphony by Albert Chiaffarelli which incorporated themes by W. C. Handy. Although this was not the first attempt to present Handy's music in a concert setting, it was the first which pleased Handy. Yerkes often mixed classical musicians with jazz artists in his sessions, and as such he could be considered an originator of the "jazz fusion" concept. He played an important role in bringing Ted Lewis to Columbia.
