= James V. Monaco =

Italian-American composer of popular music (1885–1945)

James Monaco
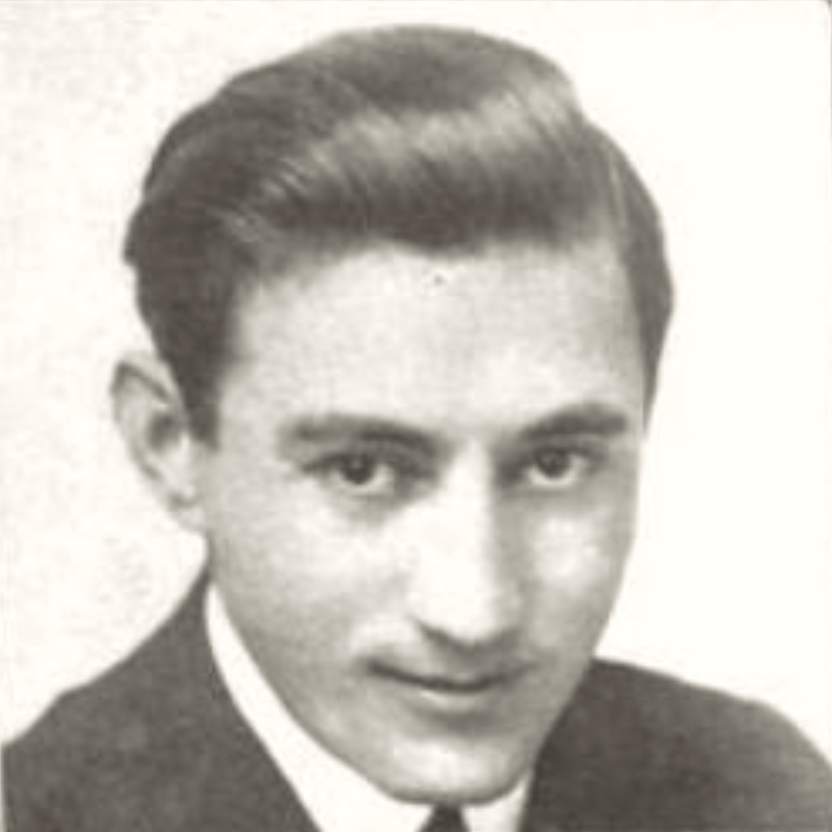
- 1915 photo of James V. Monaco

Background information
- Born: James Vincent Monaco; January 13, 1885; Foiano di Val Fortore, Italy
- Died: October 16, 1945 (aged 60) Beverly Hills, California, U.S.
- Genre: Popular music
- Occupation: Composer
- Instrument: Piano
- Years active: 1911–1945

James Vincent Monaco (January 13, 1885 – October 16, 1945) was an Italian-born American composer of popular music.

== Life and career ==
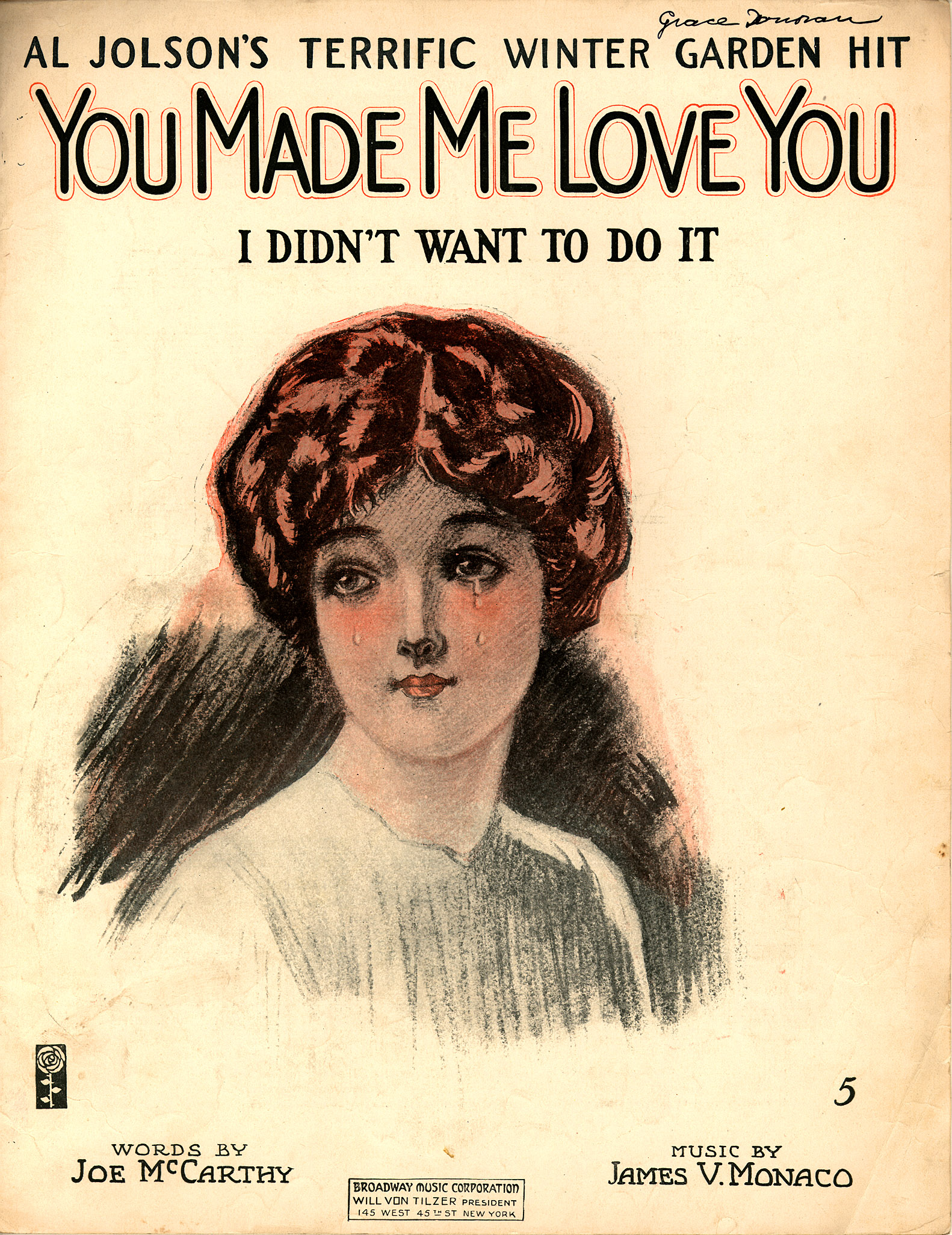
"You Made Me Love You", introduced by Al Jolson in 1913

Monaco was born in Foiano di Val Fortore, Italy. His family emigrated to the United States when he was six, and he grew up in Albany, New York, where he started playing piano in bars by the age of 18. He relocated to Chicago, where he became known as "Ragtime Jimmie", before moving to New York City in 1910.

He played piano at cafes in Manhattan and at Coney Island, and wrote his first successful song, "Oh, You Circus Day", which was featured in a Broadway revue, Hanky Panky, in 1911. Further success came the following year with "Row, Row, Row" (lyrics by William Jerome) in the Ziegfeld Follies of 1912, and perhaps his best remembered song, "You Made Me Love You" (with lyrics by Joseph McCarthy), which was introduced by Al Jolson in 1913 and performed by Judy Garland with revised lyrics as "Dear Mr Gable" in 1937.

In 1914, Monaco became a charter member of the American Society of Composers, Authors and Publishers. Over the next two decades, Monaco "presented the almost archetypal portrait of a successful Tin Pan Alley writer."

Working with a number of lyricists, he wrote several more hits, including "What Do You Want to Make Those Eyes at Me For?" (1916; lyrics by Joseph McCarthy and Howard Johnson) and "Dirty Hands, Dirty Face" (1923; lyrics by Grant Clarke and Edgar Leslie), which was performed in 1927 by Al Jolson in The Jazz Singer. He continued to work with Edgar Leslie, and their 1932 song "Crazy People" was used as the theme song to George Burns and Gracie Allen's radio program. In the mid-1930s, Monaco also led his own dance band.

He moved to Hollywood in 1936 to work for Paramount Studios, and formed a songwriting partnership with lyricist Johnny Burke. They wrote successfully for several Bing Crosby movies, including the songs "My Heart Is Taking Lessons" (1938, from Doctor Rhythm), "I've Got a Pocketful of Dreams" (1938, from Sing You Sinners), and "Only Forever" (1940, from Rhythm on the River).

From 1942, Monaco worked with several lyricists, including Mack Gordon; their most successful song was "I Can't Begin to Tell You" from the 1945 film The Dolly Sisters, one of four Monaco compositions that were nominated for Oscars.

Monaco died from a heart attack in 1945 in Beverly Hills, California, aged 60.

== Awards and recognition ==
Four of Monaco's songs received Academy Award nominations for Best Song:

- "Only Forever" (lyrics by Johnny Burke) from the 1940 film Rhythm on the River
- "We Mustn't Say Goodbye" (lyrics by Al Dubin) from the 1943 film Stage Door Canteen
- "I'm Making Believe" (lyrics by Mack Gordon) from the 1944 film Sweet and Low-Down
- "I Can't Begin to Tell You" (lyrics by Mack Gordon) from the 1945 film The Dolly Sisters. This was a posthumous nomination.

Monaco was posthumously inducted into the Songwriters Hall of Fame in 1970.

In 2005, a revue of Monaco's music called Ragtime Jimmie opened in New York City as part of the American Composer Series.
