= Don Juan (1926 film) =

1926 film by Alan Crosland

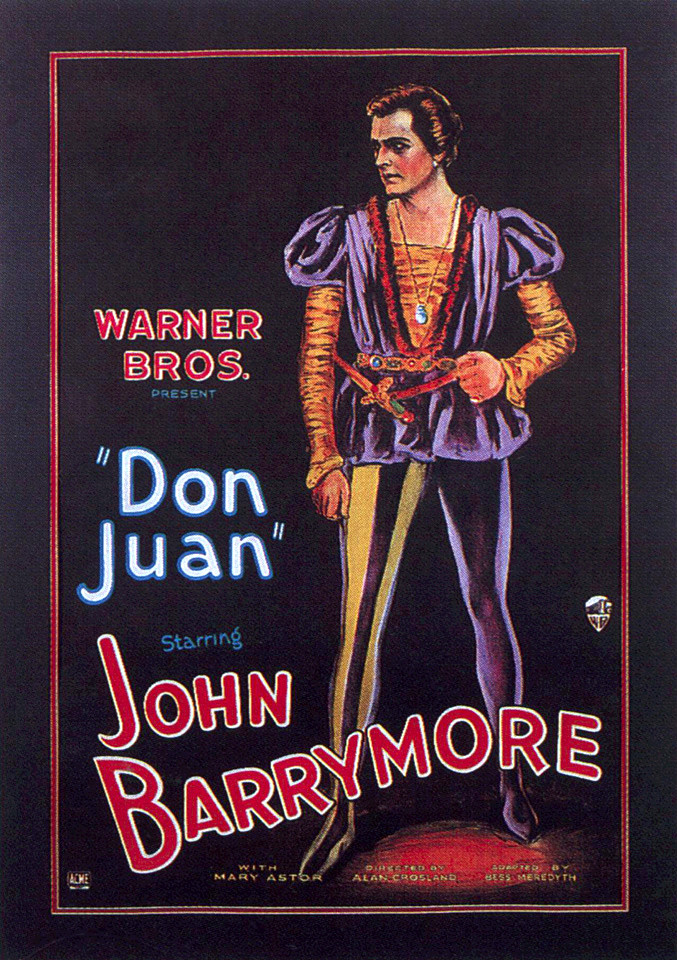
- Theatrical release poster
- Directed by: Alan Crosland
- Written by: Walter Anthony (intertitles); Maude Fulton (intertitles); Victor Vance (art titles)
- Screenplay by: Bess Meredyth
- Based on: Don Juan; 1821 poem by Lord Byron
- Starring: John Barrymore
- Cinematography: Byron Haskin
- Edited by: Harold McCord
- Music by: William Axt; David Mendoza; Major Bowes
- Production company: The Vitaphone Corporation
- Distributed by: Warner Bros. Pictures
- Release date: August 6, 1926
- Running time: 112 minutes
- Country: United States
- Languages: Sound (Synchronized) (English Intertitles)
- Budget: $546,000
- Box office: $1,693,000 (worldwide rental)

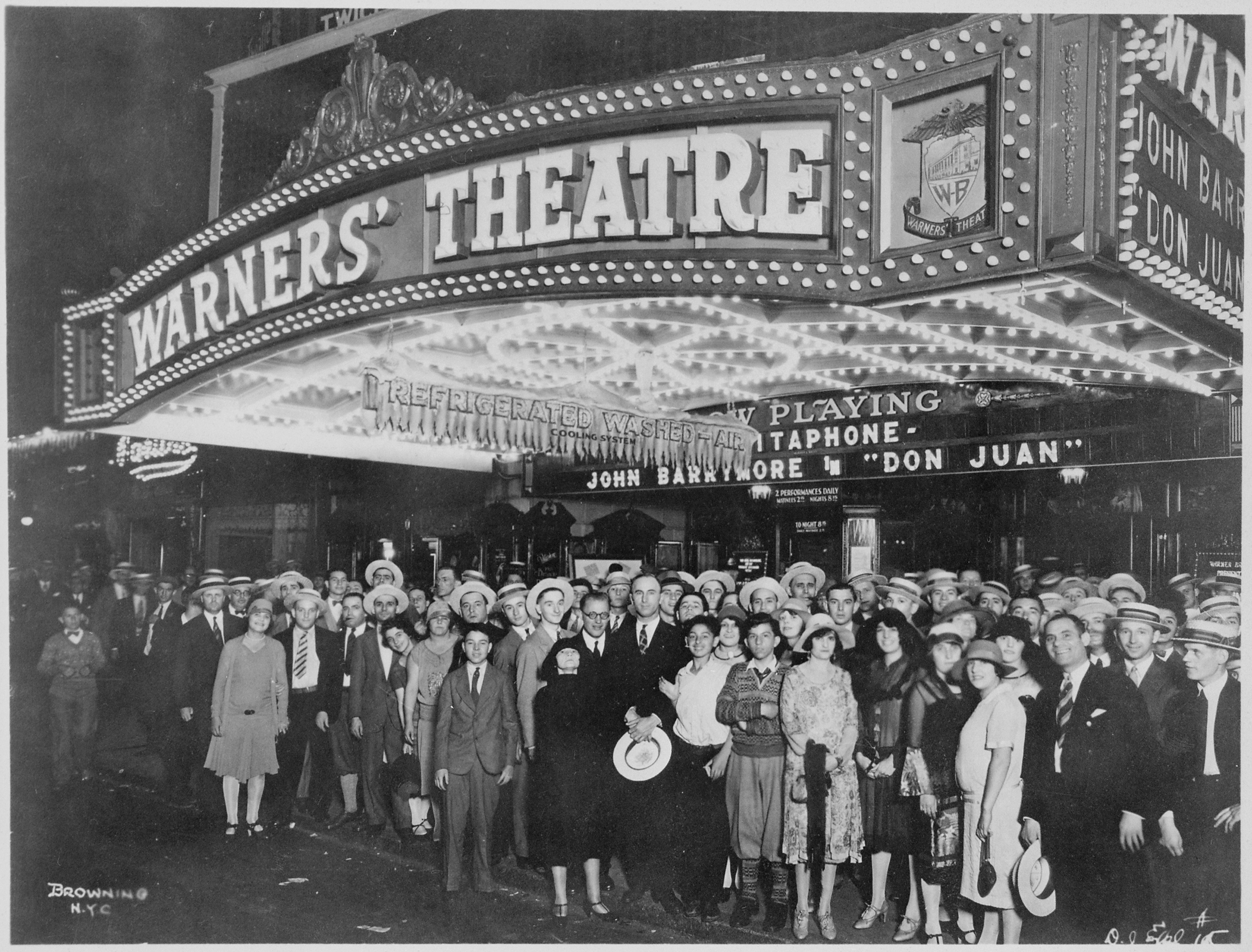
First-nighters posing for the camera outside the Warners' Theatre before the premiere (August 6, 1926)

Don Juan is a 1926 synchronized sound American romantic adventure film directed by Alan Crosland. It is the first feature-length film to utilize the Vitaphone sound-on-disc sound system with a synchronized musical score and sound effects, though it has no spoken dialogue. The film is inspired by Lord Byron's 1821 epic poem of the same name. The screenplay was written by Bess Meredyth with intertitles by Maude Fulton and Walter Anthony.

Don Juan stars John Barrymore as the hand-kissing womanizer.

== Plot ==
Don Juan (1926)

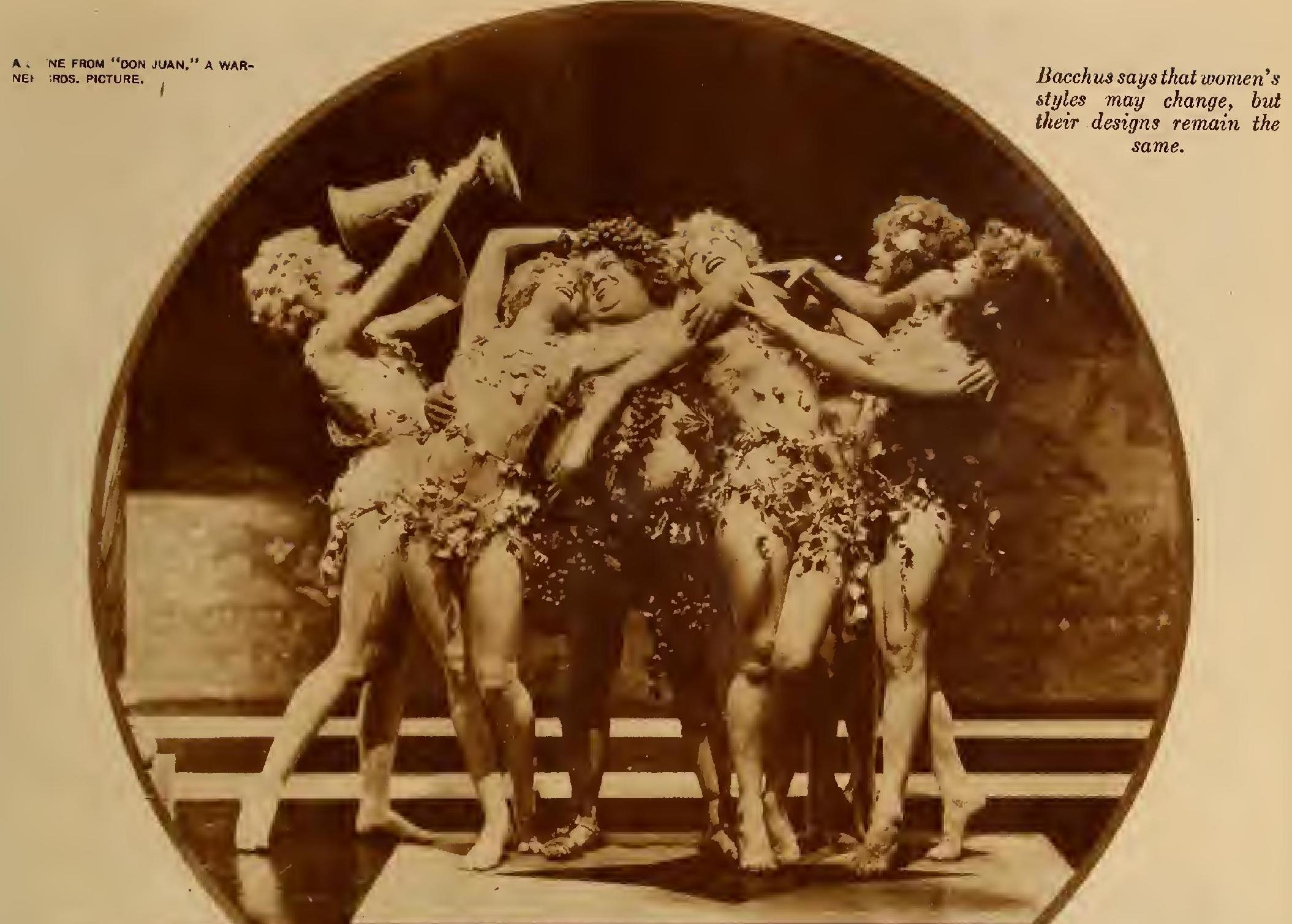
Don Juan ad in 1926 Film Fun

In the prologue, Don José, warned of his wife's infidelity, seals his wife's lover alive in his hiding place and drives her from the castle. His jealous last mistress, Donna Isobel, stabs him. With his dying words he implores his son, Don Juan, to take all from women but yield nothing. Ten years later, young Don Juan, a graduate of the University of Pisa, is famous as a lover and pursued by many women, including the powerful Lucrezia Borgia, who invites him to her ball. His contempt for her incites her hatred of Adriana, the daughter of the Duke Della Varnese, with whom he is enraptured; and Lucrezia plots to marry her to Count Giano Donati, one of the Borgia henchmen, and poison the duke. Don Juan intervenes and thwarts the scheme, winning the love of Adriana, but the Borgia declare war on the duke's kinsmen, offering them safety if Adriana marries Donati; Don Juan is summoned to the wedding, but he prefers death to marriage with Lucrezia. He escapes and kills Donati in a duel. The lovers are led to the death-tower, but while Adriana pretends suicide, he escapes; and following a series of battles, he defeats his pursuers and is united with Adriana.

== Cast ==
- John Barrymore as Don Jose de Marana / Don Juan de Marana
- Jane Winton as Donna Isobel
- John Roche as Leandro
- Warner Oland as Cesare Borgia
- Estelle Taylor as Lucrezia Borgia
- Montagu Love as Count Giano Donati
- Josef Swickard as Duke Della Varnese
- Willard Louis as Pedrillo
- Nigel De Brulier as Marchese Rinaldo
- Hedda Hopper as Marchesia Rinaldo
- Myrna Loy as Mai, Lady in Waiting
- Mary Astor as Adriana della Varnese
- Lionel Braham as Duke Margoni (uncredited)
- Helene Costello as Rena, Adriana's Maid (uncredited)
- Helena D'Algy as Donna Elvira, Murderess (uncredited)
- Yvonne Day as Don Juan at age 5 (uncredited)
- Philippe De Lacy as Don Juan at age 10 (uncredited)
- Emily Fitzroy as The Dowager (uncredited)
- John George as Hunchback / Castlekeeper / Informer (uncredited)
- Gibson Gowland as Gentleman of Rome (uncredited)
- Phyllis Haver as Imperia (uncredited)
- Sheldon Lewis as Gentleman of Rome (uncredited)
- June Marlowe as Trusia (uncredited)
- Dick Sutherland as Gentleman of Rome (uncredited)
- Gustav von Seyffertitz as Neri, the Alchemist (uncredited)
- Helen Lee Worthing as Eleanora (uncredited)

== Premiere ==
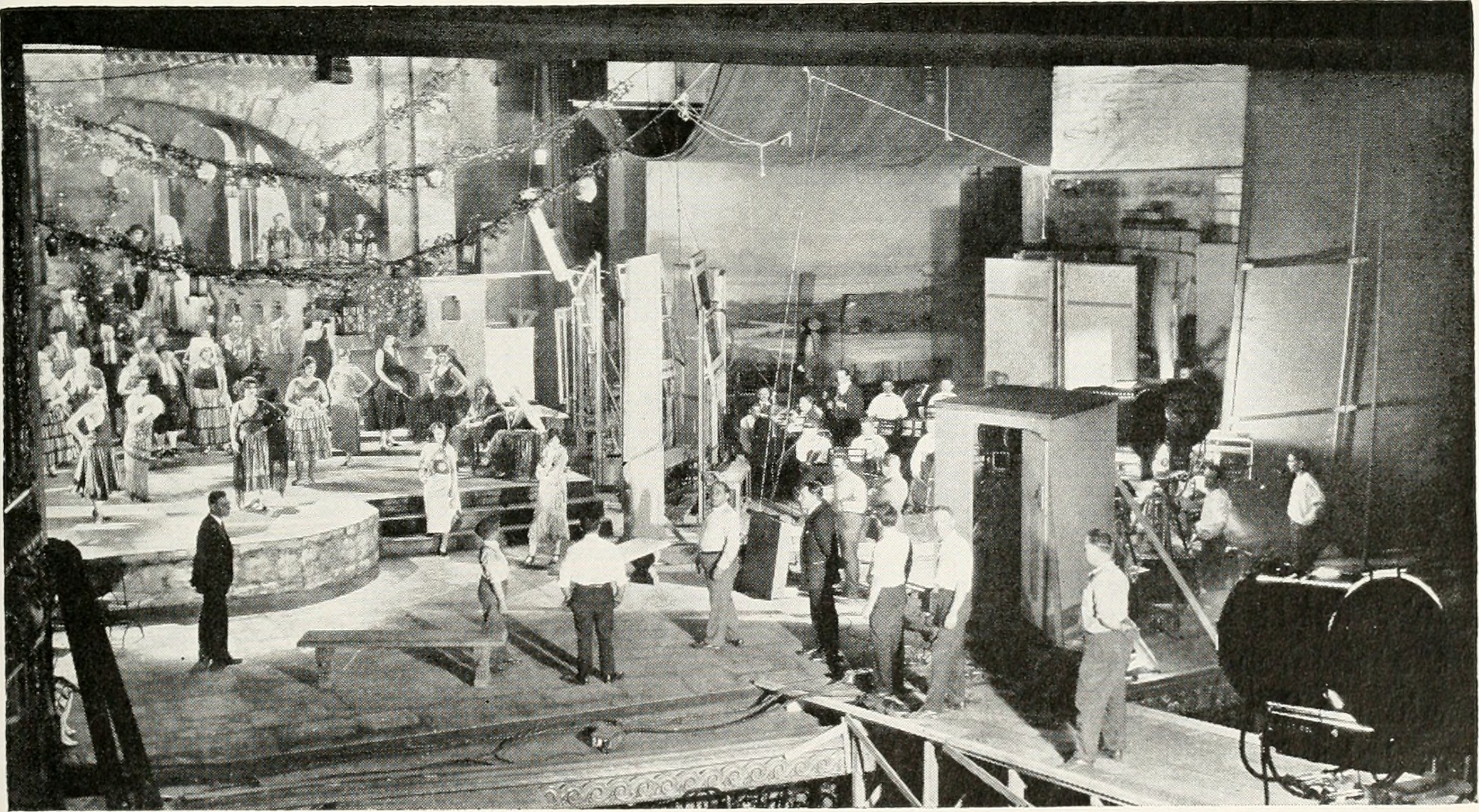
Between takes during filming of "La Fiesta"

His Pastimes (1926), one of the short films in the program originally displayed before Don Juan

Don Juan premiered August 6, 1926, at the Warner Theatre in New York preceded by a program of other shorts demonstrating Vitaphone.

Title	Year
Hon. Will H. Hays, President of the Motion Picture Producers and Distributors of America, Who Will Address You	1926
New York Philharmonic, conducted by Henry Kimball Hadley - Overture to "Tannhäuser"	1926
Mischa Elman - "Humoresque" and "Gavotte"	1926
Roy Smeck The Wizard of the String in His Pastimes	1926
Marion Talley, with the Vitaphone Symphony Orchestra conducted by Herman Heller - "Caro Nome" from "Rigoletto"	1926
Efrem Zimbalist and Harold Bauer - Theme and Variations from "The Kreutzer Sonata"	1926
Giovanni Martinelli, with the Vitaphone Symphony Orchestra conducted by Herman Heller - "Vesti La Giubba"	1926
Anna Case in "La Fiesta", Soprano Solo, Assisted by The Cansinos, Spanish Dancers, and the Metropolitan Opera Chorus	1926

== Production ==
Lou Tellegen, an early film matinee idol, had starred in a Broadway production based on the Don Juan legend in 1921. This play ran only 14 performances at the Garrick Theatre. The soundtrack for the film was performed by the New York Philharmonic. George Groves, on assignment from The Vitaphone Corporation, was charged with recording the soundtrack to the film. He devised an innovative, multi-microphone technique and performed a live mix of the 107-piece orchestra. In doing so he became the first music mixer in film history.

== Reception ==
The film was a box-office success being Warners' biggest grossing film to date with earnings of $1,693,000 despite negative reviews from New York film critics. According to Warners records, the film earned $1,258,000 in the U.S. and $435,000 in other markets.

Opening night tickets cost $10, and it was the first film on Broadway to charge over $3 for a regular ticket with the top prices at $3.30 each night. In the five performances over the weekend, it grossed $13,787 with people literally fighting to get in and tickets changing hands for $5.

== Legal issues ==
On August 24, two weeks after the premiere, The New York Times reported that ASCAP was pursuing claims of copyright infringement on behalf of publisher Robbins-Engel Music over the score for Don Juan. Composer William Axt had used two pieces that he had previously composed for a silent film mood music library owned by Robbins-Engel, "The Fire Agitato" and "In Gloomy Forest," along with several pieces of European classical music that were still under copyright. One of the compositions Axt interpolated in the score for Don Juan was "Till Eulenspiegel's Merry Pranks," a tone poem by the German composer Richard Strauss. At the time of the event, the Warner Theatre had a valid ASCAP license for public performance, and had paid the statutory mechanical royalties for the Vitaphone discs containing the soundtrack audio, but they had not licensed the copyrighted compositions specifically for synchronization rights. The matter was settled out of court, and the Warner Theatre's Music Director, Herman Heller, assigned Ottalie Mark to the task of creating a copyright research database for Warner Bros. Pictures to prevent further infringement claims.

== Preservation ==
A print of Don Juan, including its Vitaphone soundtrack, still survives and is preserved at the UCLA Film and Television Archive.

== Home media ==
In 2011, the film, along with the original Vitaphone sound shorts, was released on manufactured-on-demand DVD by the Warner Archive Collection.

== See also ==
- List of early sound feature films (1926–1929)
- List of early Warner Bros. talking features
