= Louis Silvers =

American film composer (1889–1954)

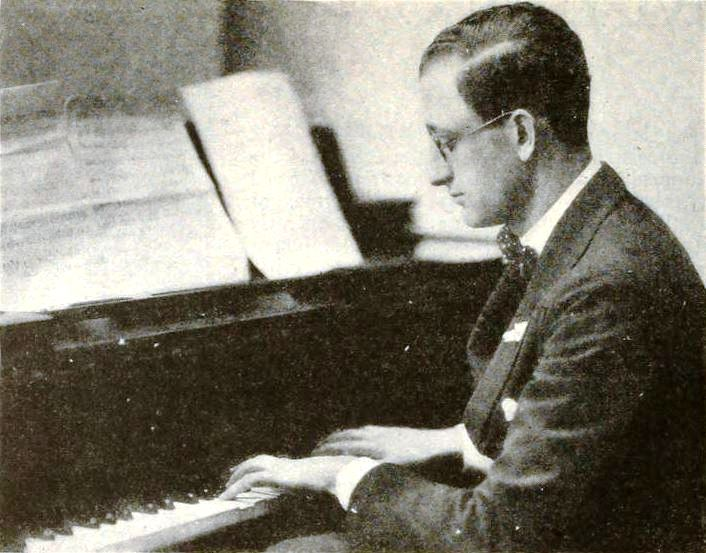
- Silvers in 1921

Background information
- Also known as: Lou Silvers
- Born: Louis Silberstein; September 6, 1889; New York City, New York, U.S.
- Died: March 26, 1954 (aged 64) Hollywood, California, U.S.
- Occupation: Film composer
- Spouse: Janet Adair

Louis "Lou" Silvers (né Louis Silberstein; September 6, 1889 – March 26, 1954) was an American film score composer whose work has been used in more than 250 movies. In 1935, he won the first Academy Award for Best Original Score for One Night of Love.

== Early life ==
Silvers was born in New York City as Louis Silberstein.

== Career ==
Silvers scored the sound sequences in the D. W. Griffith film Dream Street (1921), and scored the part-talking feature film The Jazz Singer (1927). He was also music director for Lux Radio Theater for most of its long run (1934–1955).

He is the composer of the song "April Showers" (1921).

== Personal life and death ==
Silvers was married to Janet Adair. On March 26, 1954, Silvers died of a heart ailment in Hollywood, California.

== Awards and nominations ==
Year	Award	Result	Category	Film
1935	Academy Award	Won	Best Music, Score	One Night of Love
1938	Academy Award	Nominated	Best Music, Score	In Old Chicago
1939	Academy Award	Nominated	Best Music, Original Score	Suez
1940	Academy Award	Nominated	Best Music, Scoring	Swanee River

== Selected filmography ==
- Sonny Boy (1929)
- No Greater Glory (1934)
- Woman Haters (1934)
- The Girl Friend (1935)
- A Message to Garcia (1936)
- Private Number (1936)
- The Little Princess (1939)

== Bibliography ==
=== References ===
- ASCAP (1980). "Silvers, Louis" → ASCAP Biographical Dictionary (4th ed.). Jaques Cattell Press. p. 465. ISBN 9780835212830 – via Internet Archive (Kahle/Austin Foundation). LCCN 80-65351; ISBN 0-8352-1283-1.
- Catalogue of Copyright Entries. "Part 3: Musical Compositions." "New Series" – via Google Books.
"April Showers," B.G. DeSylva (words), Silvers (music).
1. Vol. 16. Part 2. September 1921. No. 9. ©15 July 1921; E 515575 (Class E; musical composition); Harms, Inc. p. 1078.
- Limbacher, James; Wright, H. Stephen Jr. (1991). "Louis Silvers" → Keeping Score – Film and Television Music, 1980–1988 (with additional coverage of 1921–1979). Scarecrow Press. pp. 7, 11, 617. ISBN 9780810824539 – via Internet Archive (Boston Public Library). LCCN 91-21180; ISBN 0-8108-2453-1; OCLC 23975741 (all editions).
- "Louis Silberstein (born September 6, 1889)". Sworn July 5, 1922 → "U.S., Passport Applications, 1795–1925." → "Louis Silberstein." Roll 2054 → Certificates: 201600–201975; 5 July 1922 – 7 July 1922 (digital images 330 & 331 of 630). NARA – via Ancestry.com.
- "Louis Silvers" (born September 5, 1889) → "World War I Selective Service System Draft Registration Cards, 1917–1918." → "New York City" → "Manuel Montero" to "George Zuvick" (digital images 2358 & 2359 of 4239). New York: NARA Microfilm Publications – via FamilySearch.
- Gammond, Peter (1991). "Silvers, Louis" → Oxford Companion to Popular Music. p. 529 – via Internet Archive (Arcadia Fund). LCCN 90-14209; ISBN 0-1931-1323-6.
