= Harold McCord =

American film editor

- Born: July 30, 1893; New York, United States
- Died: November 3, 1957 (aged 64); Los Angeles, California, United States
- Occupation: Film editor

Harold McCord (30 July 1893 – 3 November 1957), was an American editor. He edited 8 films between 1926 and 1945, notably The Jazz Singer (1927).

He was born in New York City, United States and died in Hollywood, California.
