= American Record Co =

American Record Co may refer to:

- American Record Company
- American Record Corporation ("ARC")
