= Richard A. Whiting =

American composer and songwriter (1891–1938)

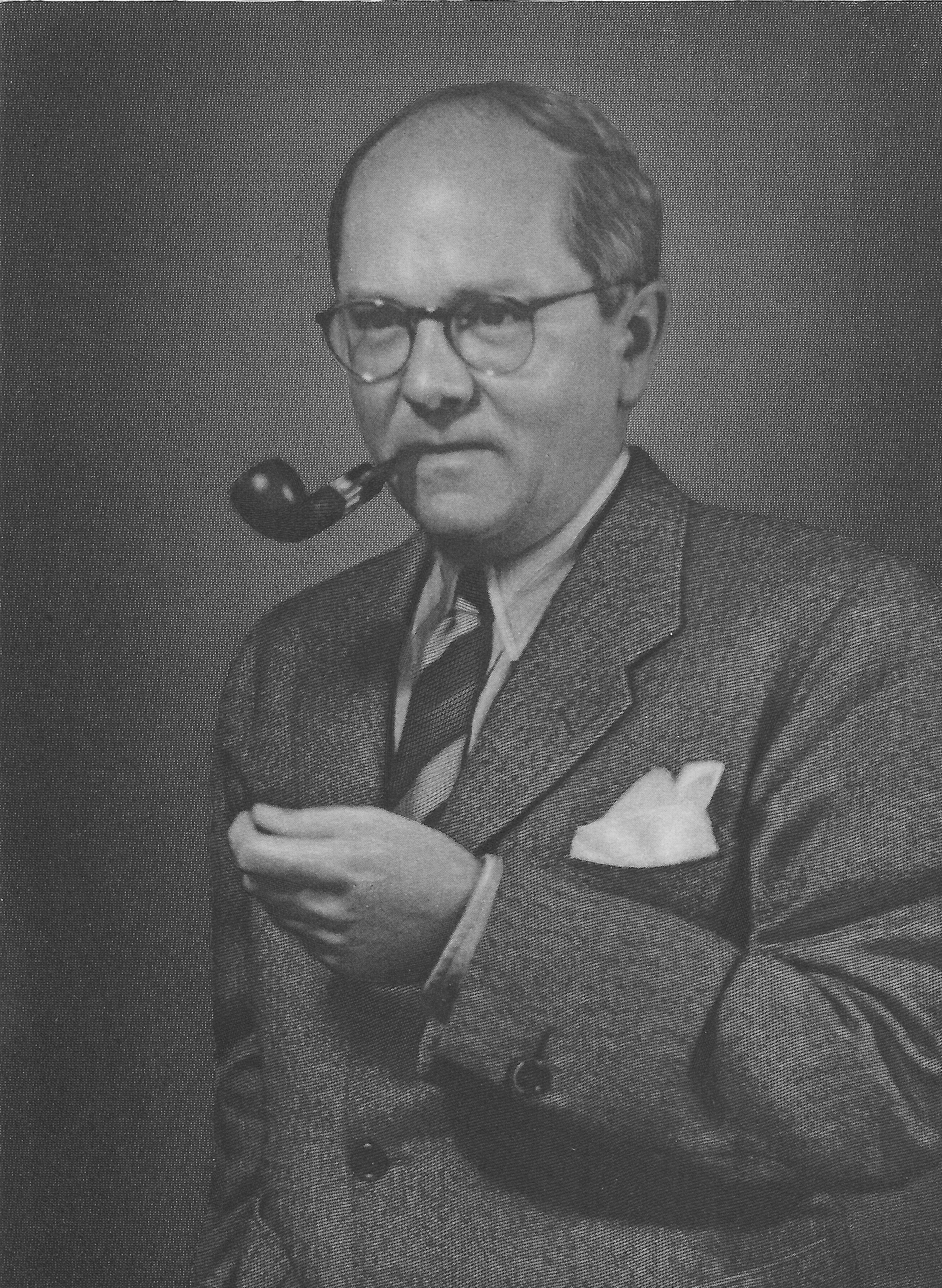
- Whiting c. mid-1930s

Background information
- Born: Richard Armstrong Whiting; November 12, 1891; Peoria, Illinois, U.S.
- Died: February 19, 1938 (aged 46) Beverly Hills, California, U.S.
- Occupations: Composer, songwriter
- Years active: 1910–1938

Richard Armstrong Whiting (November 12, 1891 – February 19, 1938) was an American composer of popular songs, including the standards "Hooray for Hollywood", "Ain't We Got Fun?" and "On the Good Ship Lollipop". He also wrote lyrics occasionally, and film scores most notably for the standard "She's Funny That Way".

He was nominated for an Academy Award for Best Original Song in 1936 for "When Did You Leave Heaven" from the film Sing, Baby Sing.

== Early life and education ==
Whiting was born in Peoria, Illinois, United States, into a musical family. His father, Frank Whiting, was a real estate agent and gifted violinist; his mother Blossom was a piano teacher. Together they instilled a love of music in their son and worked towards nurturing his natural gift of piano playing. He attended the Harvard Military School in Los Angeles. Upon his graduation, Whiting started a vaudeville act with his college friend Marshall Neilan. The pair briefly toured the United States writing songs, singing, and playing the piano; although neither one had the stage presence or singing talent to become full-time performers. They broke up the duo and went their separate ways: Neilan to Hollywood, where he would go on to be a successful film director and actor, and Whiting to Detroit to try to jump-start a career as a professional songwriter. In 1913, Whiting began his career as a song plugger for Jerome H. Remick publishing company. Within a year he was the manager of the Detroit office, being paid US$25 per week. As an occasional talent scout, Whiting nurtured the careers of several songwriters from the day, most notably George Gershwin; Whiting heard Gershwin playing one day and gave him a job as a song plugger for Remick company. This act of kindness resulted in a lifelong friendship between the two powerhouse composers. To supplement his income at the time, Whiting worked with a local hotel's Hawaiian band, playing piano in light blackface, earning him an extra $10 a week.

== Career ==
In 1914, Whiting had his first two hit songs: "I Wonder Where My Lovin' Man Has Gone" and "It's Tulip Time in Holland." The latter song became a massive hit, selling over a million copies. Whiting received none of the royalties, however, having sold off the publishing rights to Remick in exchange for a Steinway grand piano. During his time at Remick Whiting had a substantial output, mostly with former bank-clerk Ray Egan, including 1918's, "Till We Meet Again". The song quickly became the largest sheet music seller of all time, even today: at last count the song was said to have sold over 11 million copies. Other hit songs written by Whiting during his time at Remick include "Where the Black-Eyed Susans Grow" (1917), "The Japanese Sandman" (1920), "Bimini Bay" (1921, lyrics by Egan and Gus Kahn), "Ain't We Got Fun?" (1921, lyrics by Egan and Kahn) and "Ukulele Lady" (1925, lyrics by Kahn).

In 1929, Whiting moved to Hollywood, where there were more opportunities for songwriters during the Depression. In Hollywood he wrote a number of film scores and classic songs. With Johnny Mercer he wrote the theme song of Tinseltown, "Hooray for Hollywood", shortly before his death. During his career, Whiting collaborated with such songwriters as BG DeSylva, Johnny Mercer, Neil Moret, Leo Robin, Ralph Rainger, Clara Rees, Gus Kahn, Oscar Hammerstein II, Haven Gillespie, Seymour Simons, Nacio Herb Brown, Harry Akst, Walter Donaldson, Ray Egan, and Sidney Clare, to produce a number of hits (listed below). He also wrote a number of scores for Broadway plays.

In the film, Transatlantic Merry-Go-Round (1932), a song performed by The Boswell Sisters, titled "Rock and Roll", written by Richard A. Whiting and Sidney Clare, is sometimes credited as the first use of that term.

Whiting died from a heart attack in 1938 at the age of 46, at the height of his career. He was inducted into the Songwriters Hall of Fame as part of the inaugural class in 1970. A tribute to Whiting's music, along with a medley of his best-known songs, formed part of the 1980 Broadway musical A Day in Hollywood / A Night in the Ukraine. His Steinway grand piano was donated to the Great American Songbook Foundation by his granddaughter Debbi and can be seen on display.

Whiting was married to the former Eleanor Youngblood, a manager whose clients included Sophie Tucker. He was the father of singer/actress Margaret Whiting and actress Barbara Whiting, and the grandson of Rep. Richard H. Whiting.

== Film scores ==
- Our Dancing Daughters (1928)
- Close Harmony (1929)
- Innocents of Paris (1929)
- The Dance of Life (1929)
- Why Bring That Up? (1929)
- Sweetie (1929)
- Pointed Heels (1929)
- Monte Carlo (1930)
- Safety in Numbers (1930)
- Let's Go Native (1930)
- Follow Thru (1930)
- Paramount on Parade (1930)
- Playboy of Paris (1930)
- Monkey Business (1931)
- Transatlantic Merry-Go-Round (1932)
- One Hour with You (1932)
- Red-Headed Woman (1932)
- Blonde Venus (1932)
- Handle With Care (1932)
- Adorable (1933)
- My Weakness (1933)
- She Learned About Sailors (1934)
- 365 Nights in Hollywood (1934)
- Bottoms Up (1934)
- Bright Eyes (1934)
- Coronado (1935)
- Four Hours to Kill! (1935)
- The Crusades (1935)
- The Big Broadcast of 1936 (1936)
- Anything Goes (1936)
- Rhythm on the Range (1936)
- Sing, Baby Sing (1936)
- Varsity Show (1937)
- Ready, Willing, and Able (1937)
- Hollywood Hotel (1937)
- Cowboy from Brooklyn (1938)

== Broadway show scores ==
- Toot Sweet
- George White's Scandals of 1919
- Take a Chance which featured two major hits with music by Whiting "You're an Old Smoothie," and "Eadie Was a Lady"

== Selected songs ==
- 1916 "Coaling Up in Colon Town". L: Raymond Egan
- 1917 "Bravest Heart of All". L: Raymond Egan
- 1917 "I Wonder Where My Buddies Are To-Night". L: Raymond Egan and Billy Rose
- 1918 "Dress Up Your Dollars in Khaki (And Help Win Democracy's Fight)". L: Lister R. Alwood
- 1918 "I'll Love You More for Losing You a While". L: Raymond Egan
- 1919 "Eyes of the Army". L: Raymond Egan
- 1919 "Hand in Hand Again". L: Raymond Egan

=== Free for All ===
Original Music by Richard A. Whiting, lyrics by Oscar Hammerstein II

Act 1 consists of

- "I Love Him, the Rat" sung by Anita Allen and Joe Butler (Perpetual Student at Leland Stanford)
- "Free For All" sung by Michael Byrne (a Radical Poet) and The Gang
- "The Girl Next Door" sung by Anita Allen and Steve Potter, Jr. (Son of Stephen, Sr.)
- "Living in Sin" sung by Gracie Maynard, Joan Summer (Youngest of the Gang), Joe Butler (Perpetual Student at Leland Stanford) and Andy Bradford
- "Just Eighteen" sung by Joan Summer (Youngest of the Gang) and Andy Bradford
- "Not That I Care" sung by Anita Allen and Steve Potter, Jr. (Son of Stephen, Sr.)
- "Slumber Song" Sung by Marishka Tarasov and Michael Byrne (a Radical Poet)

Act 2 consists of

- "When Your Boy Becomes a Man" sung by Silver Dollar Kate and Anita Allen
- "Tonight" sung by Marishka Tarasov and Anita Allen
- "Nevada Moonlight" sung by Joe Butler (Perpetual Student at Leland Stanford), Gracie Maynard and Ensemble

Richard Whiting was also referenced in the 1980 Broadway show a Day in Hollywood/ a Night in the Ukraine where a medley of his songs are performed in the first act. One of the actors comically portrays him during the song It All Comes Out of the Piano.

== Hit songs ==
- "Ain't We Got Fun?"
- "Beyond the Blue Horizon" (music by Whiting and W. Franke Harling, words by Leo Robin)
- "Breezin' Along with the Breeze"
- "Eadie Was a Lady" (music by Whiting and Nacio Herb Brown)
- "Guilty" (music by Whiting and Harry Akst, words by Gus Kahn)
- "Have You Got Any Castles, Baby"
- "Honey"
- "Hooray for Hollywood"
- "Horses" (Byron Gay, Richard A. Whiting)
- "It's Tulip Time in Holland"
- "Love Is on the Air Tonight"
- "Miss Brown to You"
- "My Future Just Passed"
- "My Ideal" (music by Whiting and Newell Chase, words by Leo Robin)
- "On the Good Ship Lollipop"
- "Ride, Tenderfoot, Ride"
- "Sentimental and Melancholy" (words by Johnny Mercer)
- "She's Funny That Way" (words only; music by Neil Moret)
- "Silhouetted in the Moonlight"
- "Sleepy Time Gal" (Music by Ange Lorenzo & Richard Whiting, lyrics by Joseph R. Alden & Raymond B. Egan)
- "The Japanese Sandman"
- "They Made It Twice as Nice as Paradise"
- "Till We Meet Again"
- "Too Marvelous for Words" (words by Johnny Mercer)
- "When Did You Leave Heaven?"
- "Where the Black-Eyed Susans Grow"
- "Where the Morning Glories Grow"
- "You're an Old Smoothie"
- "You've Got Something There"
- "Ukulele Lady"

== Recordings ==
Frank Sinatra recorded Whiting's "Too Marvelous for Words" on his album Songs for Swingin' Lovers!. Sinatra also recorded Whiting's "She's Funny That Way" on his album Nice 'n' Easy, and other songs such as "My Ideal".

Tony Bennett recorded many of Whiting's songs, such as "My Ideal" on his album Here's to the Ladies, "True Blue Lou" and "She's Funny That Way."

Margaret Whiting (his daughter) recorded and made famous several Whiting hits including "Guilty", "Too Marvelous for Words" and "Ain't We Got Fun?"

Other notable artists to record Whiting songs:

- Louis Armstrong
- Tony Bennett
- Chet Baker
- Josephine Baker
- Nora Bayes
- The Boswell Sisters
- Al Bowlly
- Dave Brubeck
- Henry Burr
- Cab Calloway
- Cher
- Shirley Horn
- Maurice Chevalier
- Eric Clapton
- Rosemary Clooney
- Nat King Cole
- John Coltrane
- Perry Como
- Ray Conniff
- Bing Crosby
- Doris Day
- Bobby Darin
- Vaughn De Leath
- Kenny Dorham
- Tommy Dorsey
- Eddy Duchin
- Bob Dylan
- Eliane Elias
- Ruth Etting
- Alice Faye
- Michael Feinstein
- Ella Fitzgerald
- Helen Forrest
- Judy Garland
- George Gershwin
- Stan Getz
- Benny Goodman
- Eydie Gormé
- Annette Hanshaw
- Coleman Hawkins
- Billie Holiday
- Bob Hope
- J.J. Johnson
- Al Jolson
- Isham Jones
- Dave Koz
- Diana Krall
- Frances Langford
- Abbe Lane
- Peggy Lee
- Liberace
- Jeanette MacDonald
- Fred MacMurray
- Wynton Marsalis
- Dean Martin
- Mary Martin
- Tony Martin
- Carmen McRae
- Ethel Merman
- Bette Midler
- Glenn Miller
- Wendy Moten
- Michael Nesmith
- Anita O'Day
- Renee Olstead
- Joe Pass
- Oscar Peterson
- Dick Powell
- Diana Ross
- Art Tatum
- Shirley Temple
- Artie Shaw
- Bobby Short
- Frank Sinatra
- Jo Stafford
- Kay Starr
- Rod Stewart
- Tiny Tim
- Rudy Vallee
- Fats Waller
- Fred Waring
- Ian Whitcomb
- Paul Whiteman
- Margaret Whiting
- Andy Williams
- Joe Williams
- Carol Woods
- Lester Young

== Modern day usage ==
In 2006, the film A Good Year starring Russell Crowe and Marion Cotillard featured the song "Breezin' Along with the Breeze" with music by Whiting and lyrics by Haven Gillespie and Seymour Simons

In 2009, Renee Olstead used the song "Ain't We Got Fun" written by Whiting, Raymond B. Egan and Gus Kahn for her album Skylark

In 2010, Boardwalk Empire used the music from Whiting's "The Japanese Sandman" in the first five episodes of the show. A version with lyrics by Raymond B. Egan appeared in the show on October 24, 2010.

In 2010, Enrique Iglesias used a segment of "On the Good Ship Lollipop" written by Whiting and Sidney Clare for Bright Eyes in his YouTube video for the song "Tonight (I'm Lovin' You)"

In 2011, Diet Coke used Whiting's music to the song "Hooray for Hollywood" in their Oscar commercial which played nationwide in movie theaters.
