= Say a Prayer for the Boys Over There =

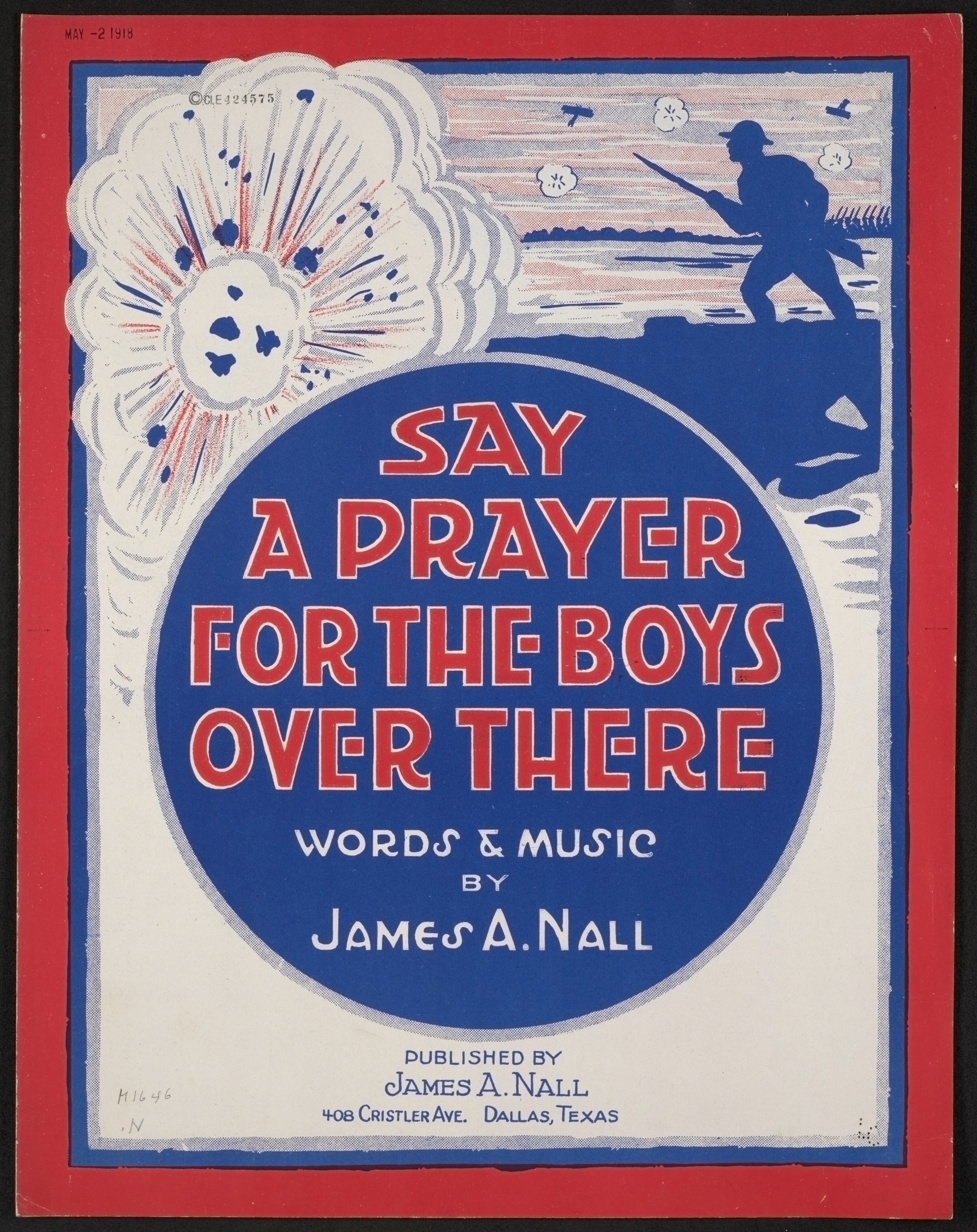
- Sheet music cover

Song by the Peerless Quartet
- Published: 1918
- Genre: Patriotic song
- Songwriter(s): James A. Nall

Say a Prayer for the Boys Over There is a song from 1918, written by James A. Nall. The song was originally performed by the Peerless Quartet and reached number on the top 100 US songs of 1918.

The cover illustration features a silhouette of a soldier fighting while surrounded by exploding artillery.

Considered to be a "flag waving tune" from World War I, "Say a Prayer for the Boys Over There" also saw popularity during the early stages of World War II and was meant to inspire patriotism and support for the war.
