= Klickmann =

Klickmann is a surname. Notable people with the surname include:

- F. Henri Klickmann (1885–1966), American composer, songwriter, musician, and arranger of music
- Flora Klickmann (1867–1958), English journalist, author, and editor
