= F. Henri Klickmann =

American songwriter

- Born: Frank Henri Klickmann; February 4, 1885; Chicago, Illinois
- Died: June 25, 1966 (aged 81); Knickerbocker Hospital, New York City
- Occupations: Composer, arranger, musician, and editor
- Years active: 1906-1946

Frank Henri Klickmann (February 4, 1885 - June 25, 1966), was a composer, songwriter, musician, and arranger of music from the 1900s to the 1940s. He composed over a hundred songs, such as "Knockout Drops" (1910), "Dynamite Rag" (1913), "Sing Me the Rosary" (1913), "The Squirrel Rag" (1913), "Hysterics Rag" (1914) and "Sweet Hawaiian Moonlight" (1918). During the 1920s, he was employed by Jack Mills Music, Inc. Orchestral arrangements from this time include "The Vamp", "Walkin' the Dog", "Don't You Remember the Time?", and "Kitten on the Keys".

== Personal life ==
Klickmann was born on February 4, 1885, in Chicago, Illinois. His father, Rudolph Klickmann, was a German immigrant. His mother Carolina (née Laufer) Klickmann was originally from Illinois. Frank was the second-born of five children: Emily (b. 1881), Ida (b. 1887), Florence (b. 1889), and Robert (b. 1890).

In 1908, Klickmann married Jeanette Klickmann. It was his first marriage and her second. They lived in Chicago for an extensive period of time, before moving to Manhattan between 1922 and 1923. They remained in New York for the remainder of their lives.

On June 25, 1966, Klickmann died at the Knickerbocker Hospital in New York. He was 81 years old.

== Career ==
In 1906, Klickmann's first publication, Oh Babe, appeared under the name F. Henri Klickmann. Many of his early "rag" songs were co-written with bandleader, Paul Biese. Together they composed the songs, The Maurice Walk and The Murray Walk. The former was written for vaudeville performers Maurice and Florence Walton, and the latter for silent film actress, Mae Murray. Klickmann occasionally played in Biese's orchestra and arranged music for them.

Klickmann's songwriting career began with, My Sweetheart Went Down With the Ship, which was a song inspired by the sinking of the Titanic. One of his first hits was a 1914 anti-war song, Uncle Sam Won't Go to War, co-written with Al Dubin. Klickmann arranged music for various music companies, including the McKinley Music Company of Chicago. In 1917, he ended his working relationship with the Paul Biese Orchestra in order to focus all his attention to arranging music. This decision provided Klickmann more time to the McKinley Music Company.

By the 1920s, Klickmann's work was being published by the largest music publishers of popular sheet music in the country, Waterson, Berlin & Snyder, Inc. At this time, he was rearranging composer Zez Confrey's songs into more readable arrangements for accompanied instruments, and working with lyricist Harold G. Frost.

In 1921, he became a member of the American Society of Composers, Authors and Publishers.

In 1923, Klickmann was hired full-time by Jack Mills Music, Inc. Under Mills, Klickmann published novelty songs, a book about jazz performance (1926), and jazz band orchestrations. He arranged music for the Six Brown Brothers and Eddie Cantor, and composed music for the ukulele and accordion. He also collaborated on a project with cartoonist Rube Goldberg, based on Goldberg's character, Boob McNutt.

Klickmann edited various books containing the popular pieces of musicians, Wendell Hall, Buddy Rich, and Tommy Dorsey.

During the 1930s, work started to wane. By 1942, Klickmann was self-employed and working for various music publishers. He also co-led a popular swing and jazz group with trombonist, Fred Norman and backing singers, Millie Bosman and Irene Redfield. In the mid-1950s, Klickmann retired.

== Selected Recordings ==
- Haydn Quartet- Just a Dream of You, Dear (1911), Victor
- Orpheus Quartet- Sing Me the Rosary (1913), Victor
- Six Brown Brothers- Tambourines and Oranges (1916), Victor
- Six Brown Brothers- My Fox Trot Girl (1917), Victor
- Six Brown Brothers- Saxophone Sam (1917), Victor
- Six Brown Brothers- The Ghost of the Saxophone (1917), Victor
- William F. Larkin- There's a Little Blue Star in the Window (and It Means All the World to Me) (1918), Victor
- American Quartet-Floatin' Down To Cotton Town (1919), Victor
- Joseph C. Smith's Orchestra- Sweet Hawaiian Moonlight (1919), Victor
- Ernest L. Stevens- Hesistation Waltz (1922), Edison
- Lewis James & Elliot Shaw- The Trail to Long Ago (1922), Victor
- Paul Biese's Novelty Orchestra- Florita (1924), Victor
- Henry Burr & Frank Croxton- Weeping Willow Lane (1925), Victor
- F. Henri Klickmann & Roy Smeck- Itching Fingers (1928), Edison
