= Vim Records =

American record label from Chicago in the early 1900s

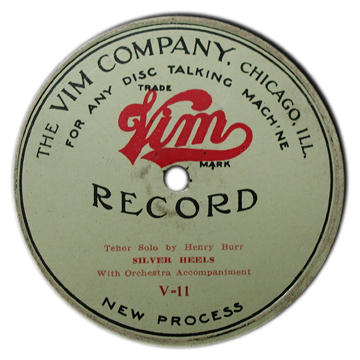
Vim Record Obverse

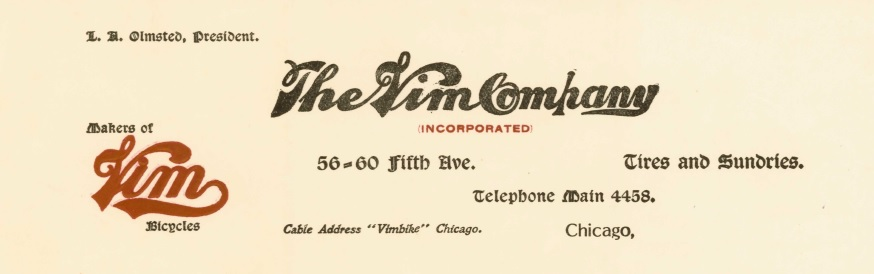
Vim Company Letterhead – 1901

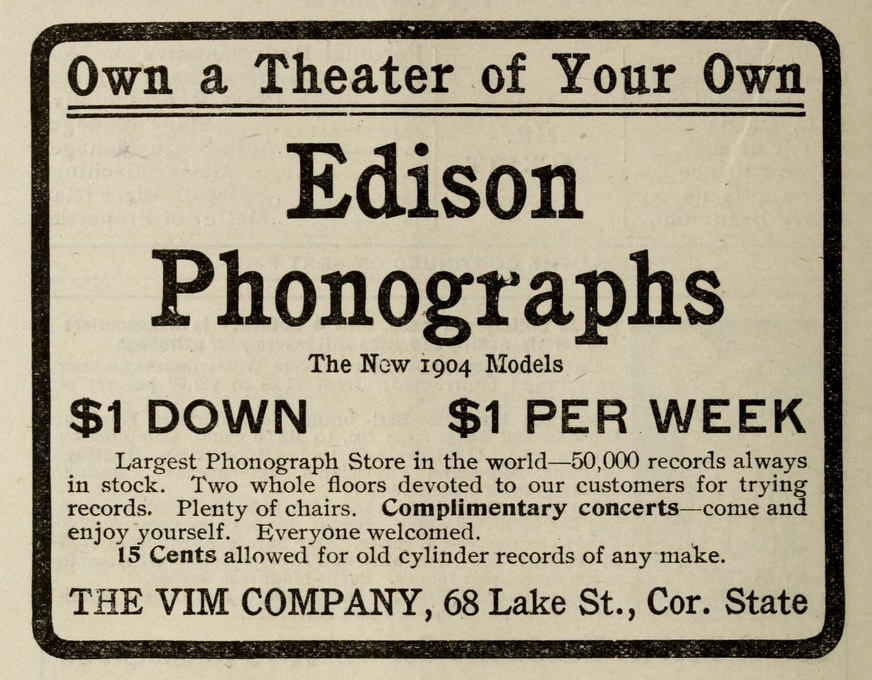
Vim Company Ad – 1903

Vim Records was a short-lived American record label that was active during the early 1900s. Vim discs include issues of ragtime banjo music recorded by Vess L. Ossman.

== History ==
The Vim Company was founded in 1896 in Chicago, Illinois, and it was active in labeling records in the first decade of the 20th century. Vim was primarily a sporting goods store but also sold bicycles and electrical goods. Record Research newsletter categorizes the firm as a "Department Store Label", meaning the owners entered an agreement with an already established record company, and "... they proceeded to have their own records pressed with the name of the department store prominently printed on the label."

Vim Records were single-sided lateral cut disc records. Vim was recorded and manufactured by the International Talking Machine Company and Leeds & Catlin.

The company offices were moved between 1901 and 1903. Known address are:

- 56-60 Fifth Avenue, Chicago, Illinois
- 68 E. Lake Street, Chicago, Illinois (1903); after street renumbering this was 10 Lake Street
- 39 S. Clark Street, Chicago, Illinois; Company Headquarters

A branch office was opened in late 1903 at 704 West Walnut Street, Des Moines, Iowa. In 1906 the branch was moved to 808 West Walnut Street, and in 1907 it was moved to 204 7th Street. This location remained open until late 1908 when the firm of Harger & Blish, an established firm from Dubuque, Iowa, were appointed the jobbers in Des Moines.

The last listing for the firm producing records in Chicago was in the Edison Phonograph Monthly January 1910 issue.

The owner and president of the company was Leon Atwell Olmsted, a native of New York who moved to Chicago in the 1890s. After opening his first store in 1896, he eventually expanded to seven stores in Chicago and another seventeen throughout the nation. It was reported that he died in a fire at his home in Minocqua, Wisconsin, at the age of 63, but it was soon learned that he died of exhaustion after fighting the blaze. At the time of his death in 1936 the stores were being managed by his son Leslie B. Olmsted.

== Record numbers ==
The record numbers on Vim labels can be broken down into multiple series. The following companies are known to have produced records for Vim.

- Leeds & Catlin: V-prefixed records are from Sun and associated labels
- International Record Company (IRC): X-prefixed records are from Excelsior and associated labels

All unprefixed record numbers in the chart below appear to have been produced by IRC. Every artist and recording name matches up with the IRC catalog numbers.

== Record labels ==
The word "Vim" in stylized cursive text appears on all of the record labels along with a double lined border, the company name, "Chicago, Ill.", and the words, "For Any Disc Talking Machine". The background color for all labels is beige, but in some photos the coloring appears to be white, light yellow, or mint green. Aging and years of handling have caused some labels to become dark beige in appearance.

Some labels have the recording details (record number, artist, etc.) printed in black ink while others are in red ink. It is unknown if there is any significance to the printing color of the recording details.

== Recordings ==
All recordings in this chart must be verified by seeing the information on a Vim Record label or in a Vim Company catalog. A Leeds & Catlin or International Record Company catalog that do not specifically state "Vim Record" are not sources for adding new records to this chart.

Unconfirmed information in any row must have an asterisk symbol (*) placed beside the information. This may happen because the label is not readable or the information was not printed on the label. The International Record Company recording catalog is useful for obtaining Vim Records information, but unless actually seen on a Vim label, all such information should be marked with an asterisk symbol.

All information in the chart must be placed in order by the "Record Number."

Record Number	Artist(s)	Recording Name	Type	Year Recorded & Notes
	Frederichs and Strange	Jesus Lover of My Soul	Duet	This is likely baritone William Frederichs and soprano Ellen Strang, but the title is not in the IRC catalog. Spellings of their names differ.
316	Metropolitan Band	Coax Me	Medley Two Step	
343	Metropolitan Band	Washington Post March	March	
604	Peluso's Orchestra	Grand March from "Faust" (Soldier's Chorus)		
1560	Frank Stanley	In Dear Old Georgia	Baritone Solo	
1575*	Frank Stanley	The Old Church Bell	Baritone Solo*	
1604	Frank Stanley	When the Mocking Birds Are Singing in the Wildwood	Baritone Solo	
1621	Joe Brown	So Long Mary	Baritone Solo	
1640	Arthur Collins Orchestra Accompaniment	You Look Awfully Good To Father	Baritone Solo	
2050	Billy Murray*	Give My Regards to Broadway	Tenor Solo	
2054	Billy Murray	I've Got a Little Money, and I Saved it All For You	Tenor Solo	
2098	Billy Murray	You're A Grand Old Rag	Tenor Solo	
2099	Billy Murray	Cheyenne (Shy Ann)*	Tenor Solo	
2105	Billy Murray	How Would You Like to Spoon With Me?	Tenor Solo	
2180	Collins & Harlan	Jessamine	Baritone & Tenor Duet with Orchestra Accompaniment	
2707	Spencer & Jones	Every Little Bit Helps	Vaudeville Sketch	
3003	Vess L. Ossman	The Gay Gossoon	Banjo Solo	
3006	Metropolitan Band	Free Lance March (Sousa)		
3009	Metropolitan Band of New York*	The Flag of Victory March	Band*	
3040	G. P. Watson	Hi Le, Hi Lo (German Hunter Song)	Yodel Song	
3059	Metropolitan Band of New York*	Stradella Overture	Band*	
3063	Metropolitan Band of New York*	Hero of the Sea	March	
3098 (Possibly 3070?)	Vess L. Ossman	So Long Mary, Intro. "Mary's a Grand Old Name"	Banjo Solo	
3105	Collins & Harlan	It's up to You to Move	Baritone and Tenor Duet	
3113	Metropolitan Band of New York*	Royal Italian March (Gambetti)	Band	
V-2	Harold Eisenberg	Traumerei (Reverie)	Violin Solo	
V-11	Henry Burr	Silver Heels	Tenor Solo	
X304	Metropolitan Band of New York*	Merry Makers	Band	
X317	Metropolitan Band of New York*	First Kiss Waltz	Band*	
X323	Metropolitan Band of New York*	At The Race Track	Band	
X336	Metropolitan Band of New York*	The Forge in the Forest	Band	
X339	Band	Medley March Airs of '63	Band	Only the word "Band" is shown for the artist.
X617*	Orchestra	The Jolly Coppersmith	With Vocal Solo and Chorus	Only a partial record number was visible so this could by just "617".
X620	Peluso's Orchestra*	Love's Dreamland Waltz	Orchestra	
X635	Peluso's Orchestra, with calls*	Metropolitan Lanciers	Band	
X638	Peluso's Orchestra, with calls*	Recreation quadrille	Band	
X642	Peluso's Orchestra*	Miesrere from "Ill Trovatore	Orchestra	
X 1523*	Arthur Collins*	The Preacher and the Bear	Baritone and Orchestra Accompaniment	
X 1532	Frank C. Stanley*	Where the Sunset Turns to Ocean's Blue to Gold	Baritone Solo with orchestra accompaniment	
X 1572	Frank C. Stanley	Old Man Moon	Baritone Solo with Orch. Accom.	
X2087	Byron G. Harlan*	Somebody's Sweethart I want to be	Tenor Solo (w. orchestra accompaniment)	
X2163	Henry Burr & George Gordon	My Old Kentucky Home	Tenor & Baritone Duet	

== Other labels ==
There are at least two other record labels that use/used the acronym "VIM."

- Variety In Music (VIM), in New York City, approximately 1959–1964
- Very Important Music (V.I.M.), in Thessaloniki, Greece, established in 2007

== See also ==
- List of record labels
