= American Record Company =

American record label

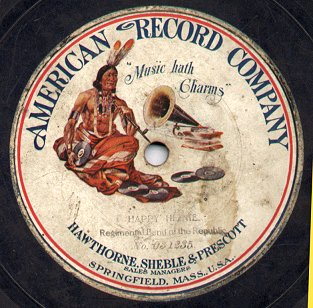
- Type: Privately held company
- Founded: 1904; United States
- Defunct: 1906
- Headquarters: United States

The American Record Company was an American record label that was in business from 1904 to 1906.

== History ==
The American Record Company (commonly abbreviated as "ARCo") was founded by Ellsworth A. Hawthorne and Horace Sheble, formerly designers of accessories for Edison Records machines at their Philadelphia-based bicycle shop; in a previous venture, they had issued a small run of brown-wax cylinders in the mid-1890s. Hawthorne and Sheble partnered with John O. Prescott, whose brother Frederick worked with International Talking Machine in Berlin, which marketed Odeon Records. The new company was based in Springfield, Massachusetts, though they maintained factories in Bridgeport, CT and Philadelphia; recordings were made in a studio in New York City. American principally produced single-sided, lateral-cut disc records on blue shellac, although two-sided issues and standard, black shellac appeared towards the end of the company's run.

== Logo ==
The label of the discs featured artwork depicting a Native American with a smoking pipe listening to a front-mount disc phonograph of undetermined manufacture; American Record Company advertising commonly marketed them as "Indian Records". Several variations of the "Indian" label exist, differing only in minor details. Most ARCo records are single sided; with their double-sided records, apparently the combination of sides were randomly chosen. The company would press any two sides paired, if the buyer met the minimum-order qualification. These records are notable for being blue in color, rather than the usual black, pressed from a shellac compound called Empedite which reputedly delivered better sound quality than standard black shellac. The records appear to have been numbered using a sequence which began at 030000; the highest number known is 031435. The records exist in 7-inch, 10-inch and 10.75-inch sizes, with the latter size being derived from its connection with Odeon, which also used that size. The seven-inch discs used a different numbering sequence and seem to have only been produced for a short time. Some export pressings for Britain carried the "American Odeon Record" logo.

== Legacy ==
Unlike most American producers of discs apart from Victor and Columbia in the first decade of the twentieth century, American Record Company made their own recordings in direct contravention to existing patents. The most important contribution made by ARCo to the history of recorded sound is that they made the earliest surviving records of Hawaiian music in several discs credited to the Royal Hawaiian Troubadours; this was a group led by July Paka. The house band was called the Regimental Band of the Republic and was responsible for most of the remaining instrumental selections on the label, in addition to providing accompaniments to singers. Other performers were mainly drawn from the ranks of singers that worked for Victor, Columbia and the cylinder companies, recording many of the same songs that they did elsewhere. Many ARCos are anonymous, though just as many if not more do carry an accurate credit as to the performer. Collectors of early records do value ARCOs; while not as common as early Columbias or Victors, they survive in decent numbers, especially when compared to discs on labels that they provided masters to, such as Busy Bee, Kalamazoo and Peerless. In Europe, their releases appeared on Pelican, Leader, American Odeon and Odeon.

== Roster ==
A listing of some of the artists that appeared on American Record Company.

- Henry Burr
- Arthur Collins (singer)
- Collins and Harlan
- Billy Golden
- Byron G. Harlan
- Billy Heins
- Anna Held
- Invincible Quartette
- Ada Jones
- Giuseppe Li Puma
- Charles P. Lowe
- Billy Murray (singer)
- J.W. Myers
- Vess L. Ossman
- Steve Porter (singer)
- Dan W. Quinn
- Regimental Band of the Republic
- Royal Hawaiian Troubadours
- Len Spencer
- Frank C. Stanley
- Harry Tally
- George P. Watson

== Print references ==
- American Record Label Book, Brian Rust, Da Capo, 1984.
