= Till We Meet Again (1918 song) =

1918 song

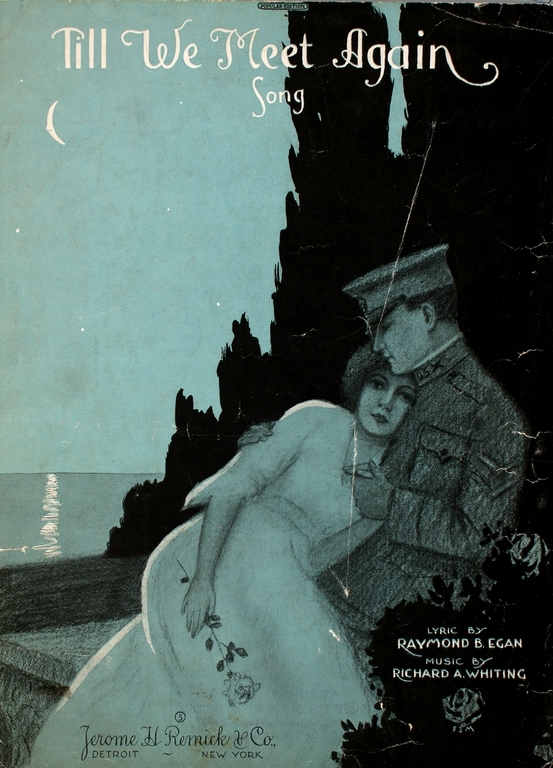
- Cover of "Till We Meet Again", 1918

Song
- Language: English
- Published: 1918 by Jerome H. Remick
- Composer: Richard A. Whiting
- Lyricist: Raymond B. Egan

Till We Meet Again
A 1919 performance of Till We Meet Again by the Nicholas Orlandos Orchestra

"Till We Meet Again" is an American popular song. The music was written by Richard A. Whiting, the lyrics by Raymond B. Egan in 1918. Written during the Great War, the song tells of the parting of a soldier and his sweetheart. The title comes from the final line of the chorus:

Smile the while you kiss me sad adieu,
When the clouds roll by I'll come to you,
Then the skies will seem more blue,
Down in lovers lane my dearie,
Wedding bells will ring so merrily,
Every tear will be a memory,
So wait and pray each night for me,
Till we meet again.

As Whiting's daughter Margaret tells it, the song was intended for a 1918 contest at a Detroit theater. Dissatisfied with the result, Whiting threw the manuscript in the trash. His secretary retrieved it and showed it to their boss, publisher Jerome Remick, who submitted it in the contest, where it won top honors.

The song gained widespread popularity in Canadian traditional music circles as a result of its use as the closing number for the CBC television program Don Messer's Jubilee. It continues to be a standard ending number for Old Time dances across the country.

In 1919, it was the number 1 song of the year as recorded by Henry Burr and Albert Campbell.

Other artists who recorded the song include: Charles Hart & Lewis James, Gitz Rice & Vernon Dalhart, Nicolas Orlando's Orchestra, British duet Coltham & Parker, Doris Day, Albert Brunies, Kid Thomas Valentine, George Lewis, Bing Crosby, Kay Starr, Patti Page, and Danielle Haim.

The song and tune was adapted by supporters of English football team, Huddersfield Town in the 1920s and is still sung by them. ("Smile Awhile")

== See also ==
- List of best-selling sheet music
