= Jerome H. Remick =

American music publisher (1867–1931)

- Born: Jerome Hosmer Remick; November 15, 1867; Detroit, Michigan, U.S.
- Died: July 15, 1931 (aged 63)
- Resting place: Elmwood Cemetery, Detroit
- Occupation: Music publisher
- Known for: Founding Remick Music Company, Shapiro-Remick & Company, Jerome H. Remick & Co.
- Spouse: Adelaide McCreery
- Children: Katherine Remick; Jerome Hosmer Remick Jr. James Albert Remick II
- Parent(s): James Albert Remick; Mary Amelia Hosmer

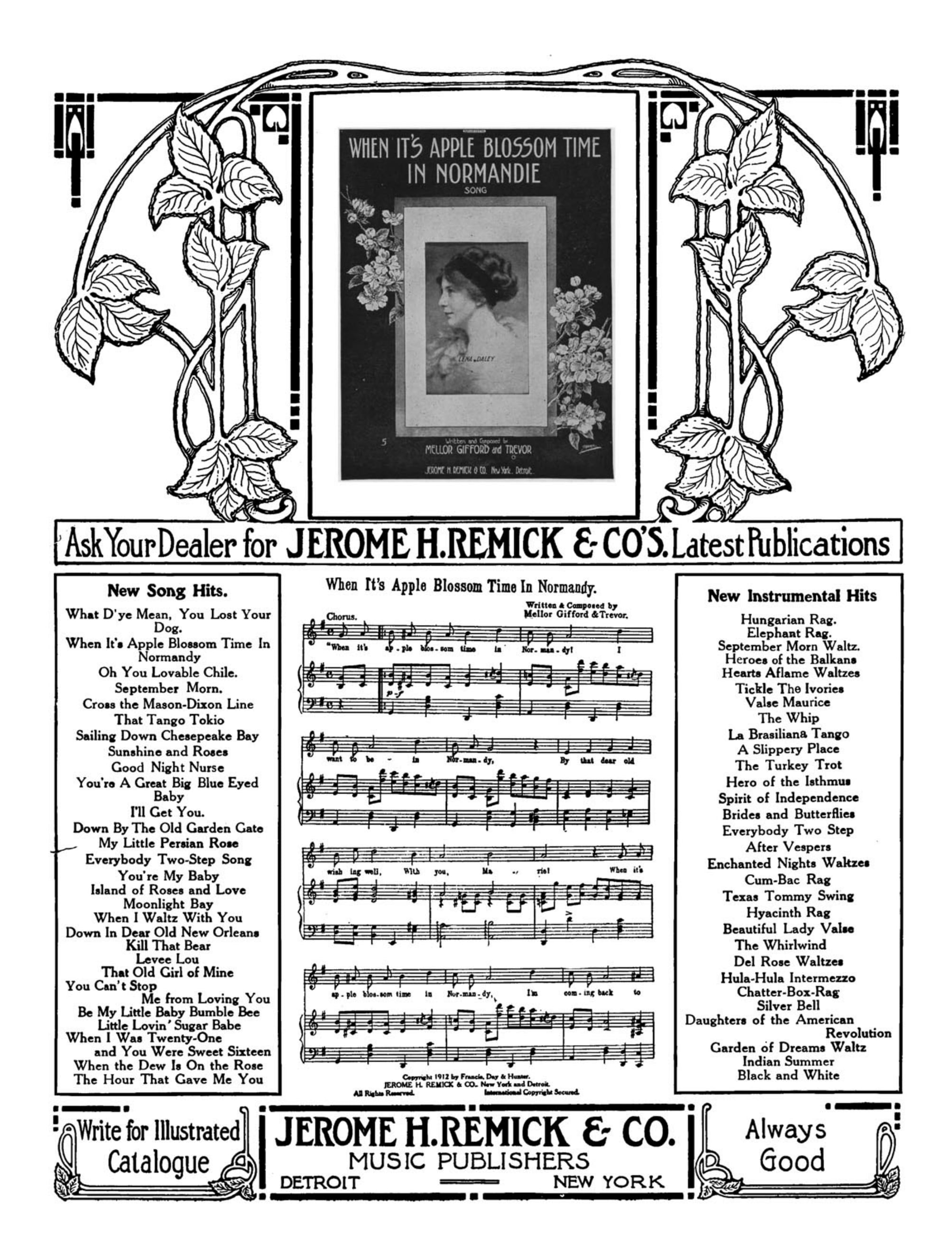

Jerome Hosmer Remick (15 November 1867 – 15 July 1931) was an American music publisher, businessman and philanthropist in Detroit, Michigan. He established Remick Music Company, Shapiro-Remick & Company with Maurice Shapiro, and then Jerome H. Remick & Co.

== Life and career ==
Remick was born in Detroit as the son of James Albert Remick and Mary Amelia Hosmer. He graduated from the Detroit Business University in 1887 before joining the Whitney-Remick lumber firm, a family business started by his grandfather, Royal C. Remick. On June 26, 1895, Remick married Adelaide McCreery in Flint, Michigan.

Remick's interests, however, did not lie in lumber but in the developing popular sheet music industry. In 1898, he bought out the small, struggling firm of Whitney-Warner Publishing Company in Detroit, whose small catalog included Smoky Topaz (composed by Grace M. Bolen) and waltzes by Henriette B. Blanke. He turned the company into an extraordinarily successful sheet music publishing house.

In 1902, Remick and Maurice Shapiro founded Shapiro-Remick & Company, selling several million copies in 1905 of the enormously successful "In the Shade of the Old Apple Tree," written by Harry Williams and Egbert Van Alstyne. The partnership was dissolved in 1906, and Remick started his own firm (known as Jerome H. Remick & Co.). Van Alstyne continued with Remick and a string of hits followed, including "Pretty Baby" and "Your Eyes have Told Me So."

Remick's published songs influenced popular music trends and included hundreds of hits, such as "Baby Face", "I'm Looking Over a Four Leaf Clover," "Oh, You Beautiful Doll" and "Bye Bye Blackbird," all of which contributed greatly to American heritage and culture.

In 1909, the company published three ballads that sold more than a million copies – "Put on Your Old Grey Bonnet", "Moonlight Bay" in 1912 and "When You Wore a Tulip" in 1914. The firm also published ragtime music, such as "Dill Pickles Rag" and "Black and White Rag".

George Gershwin joined Remick in 1914 and composed many songs, but he left the firm shortly after they published "Rialto Ripples" in 1917. To stay competitive, Remick began to sign up unknown writers such as Harry Warren, Al Dubin, Clara Rees, Gus Kahn and Richard A. Whiting, ushering in the golden era of the Roaring Twenties music. Changes were in the air, though. The arrival of talking pictures obliged Warner Brothers to invest in publishing houses, leading to their acquisition of Remick's company in 1929, gaining Remick's catalogue and staff writers, including Harry Warren and Al Dubin, who created hits such as "42nd Street" and "I Only Have Eyes For You."

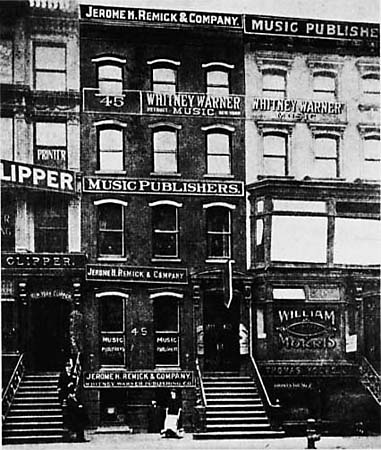
Office of Jerome H. Remick & Co. at Tin Pan Alley in New York City

While competing publishing houses were located in Michigan, New York City and Chicago, Jerome H. Remick & Co. held sway in Detroit, also running a successful printing plant from there. The firm maintained branch offices in New York City and Chicago, with agencies all over the world, and started hundreds of music outlets under the name "Remick Song Shops" throughout the United States. Oddly, Remick could not read music at all, but he had a natural understanding of public tastes.

Remick was an enthusiastic gentleman farmer and owned a 2,200-acre (8.9 km^{2}) estate on Gratiot Avenue, growing fruit and vegetables, and raising chickens. His livestock included a herd of prize Holsteins, leading to a controlling interest in the Detroit Creamery Co.

He was one of the influential patrons of the Detroit Symphony, repeatedly serving as the organization's president. His fundraising helped to create Orchestra Hall in 1919. His contributions also enabled the expansion of Detroit's orchestra to 90 players so as to persuade Ossip Gabrilowitsch, Mark Twain's son-in-law, to become the Detroit Symphony's conductor.

Remick also served as director on the boards of the pharmaceutical firm Parke-Davis & Co., the Paige Motor Co., the Detroit Savings Bank, and the Union Trust Co. He also acted as secretary of the Whitney Land Co. which operated in Oregon, and he had an interest in the Detroit Free Press. He was president of the Big Four Gold and Copper Mining Co. in Colorado, owning claims covering 11 acres (45,000 m^{2}) north of the Little Jonnie Mine in the Leadville district.

In 1928, because of ill health, Remick sold the company to his Vice-President, Jerome Keit. The new firm was called The Remick Corporation, and it was finally taken over by Warner Bros. Music. Remick died on July 15, 1931, at the age of 63, and is buried along with his wife at Elmwood Cemetery in Detroit, Michigan. Remick was survived by his wife, his children and several grandchildren.

== Gallery ==
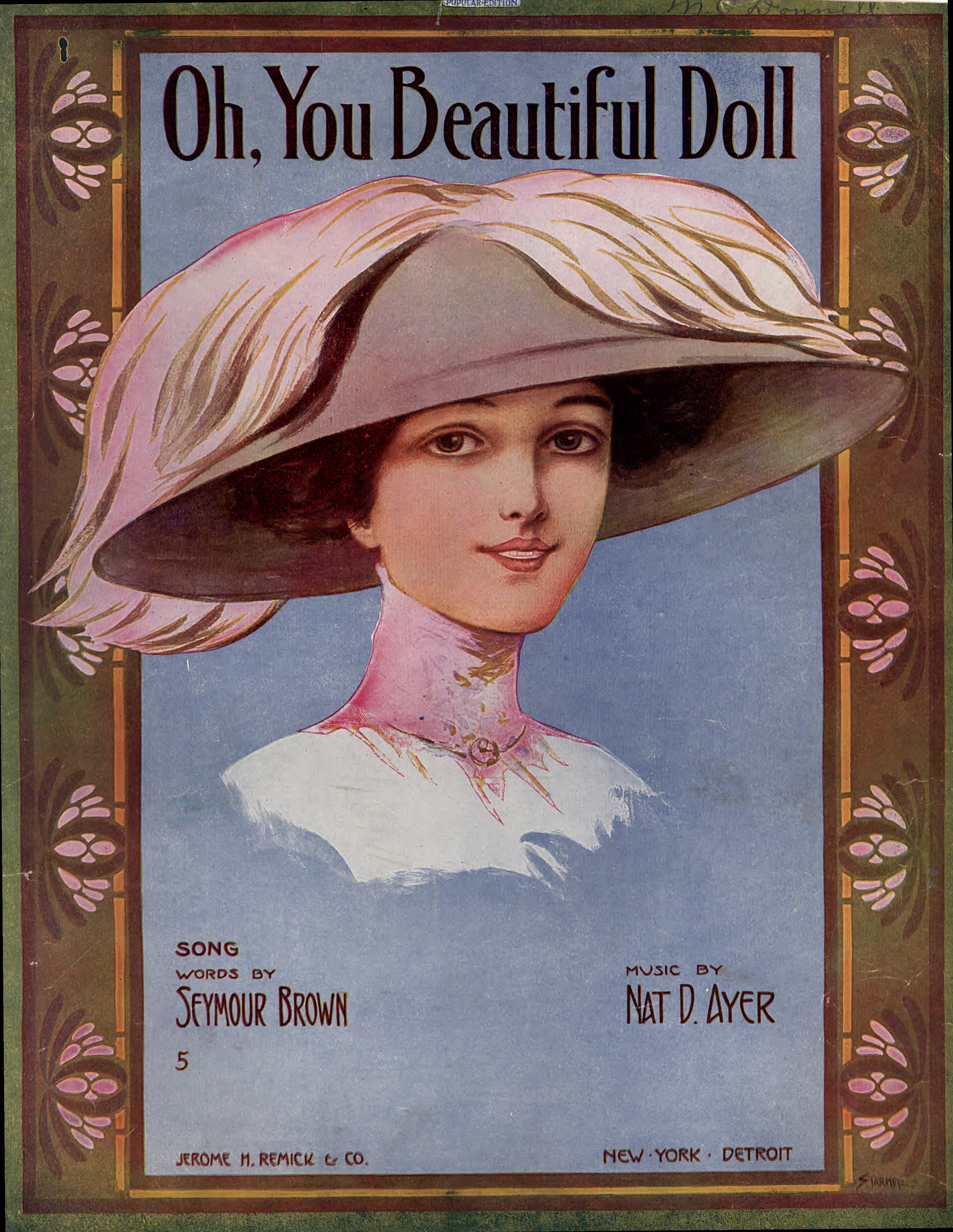
Sheet music cover for "Oh, You Beautiful Doll"

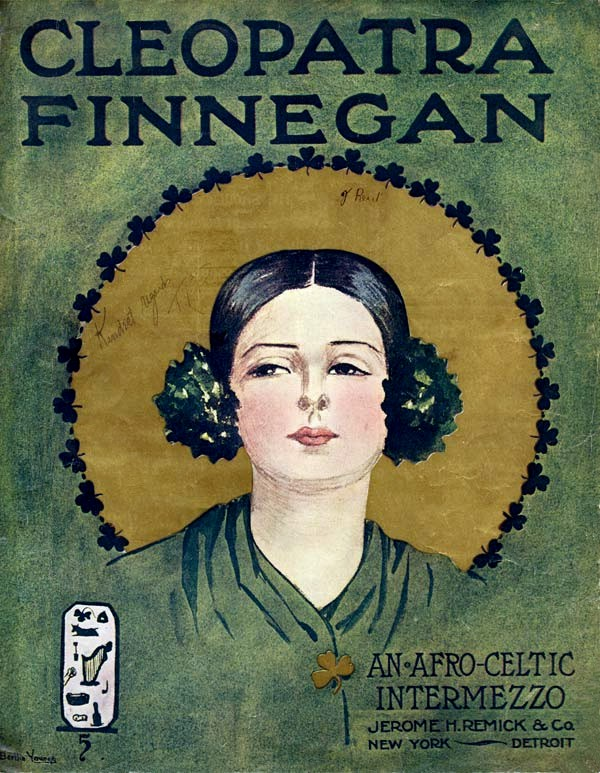
Sheet music cover for "Cleopatra Finnegan – an Afro-Celtic intermezzo"

== See also ==
- General Aeroplane Company (Remick was an investor)
- Jerome H. Remick and Company Building
