= Just a Baby's Prayer at Twilight (For Her Daddy Over There) =

1918 song by M. K. Jerome, Sam M. Lewis & Joe Young

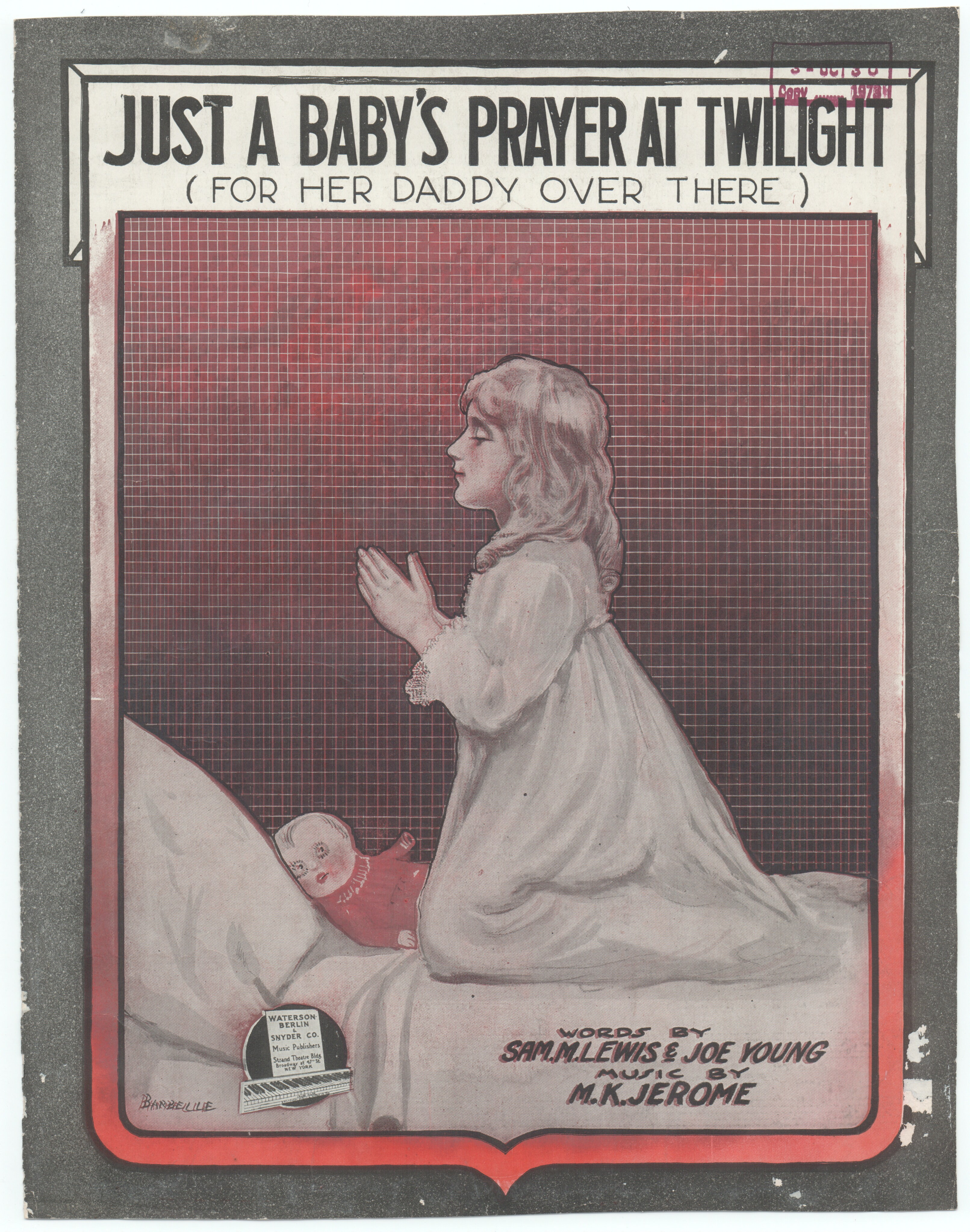
- Sheet music cover

Song
- Published: 1918
- Composer: M.K. Jerome
- Lyricists: Sam M. Lewis, Joe Young

Just a Baby's Prayer at Twilight (For Her Daddy Over There) is a 1918 song composed by M.K. Jerome, with lyrics written by Sam M. Lewis and Joe Young. The song was published by Waterson, Berlin & Snyder Co. The song was performed by Henry Burr and reached number one on the top 100 US songs of 1918. Burr's recording sold a million copies in sheet music and sales.

The 1918 publication of this song features a cover illustration by Albert Barbelle, of a young girl praying, while she kneels on her bed.

== Recordings and commercial success ==
Prince's Orchestra, Edna White's Trumpet Quartet and Charles Hart also had successful recordings of the song in 1918.

Due to its popularity at the time, it was heavily reprinted in the United States. A French edition was issued by Editions Francis Salabert.

Bing Crosby recorded the song in 1955 for use on his radio show and it was subsequently included in the box set The Bing Crosby CBS Radio Recordings (1954-56) issued by Mosaic Records (catalog MD7-245) in 2009.
