= I Didn't Raise My Boy to Be a Soldier =

American anti-war song from 1915

Cover page to the sheet music

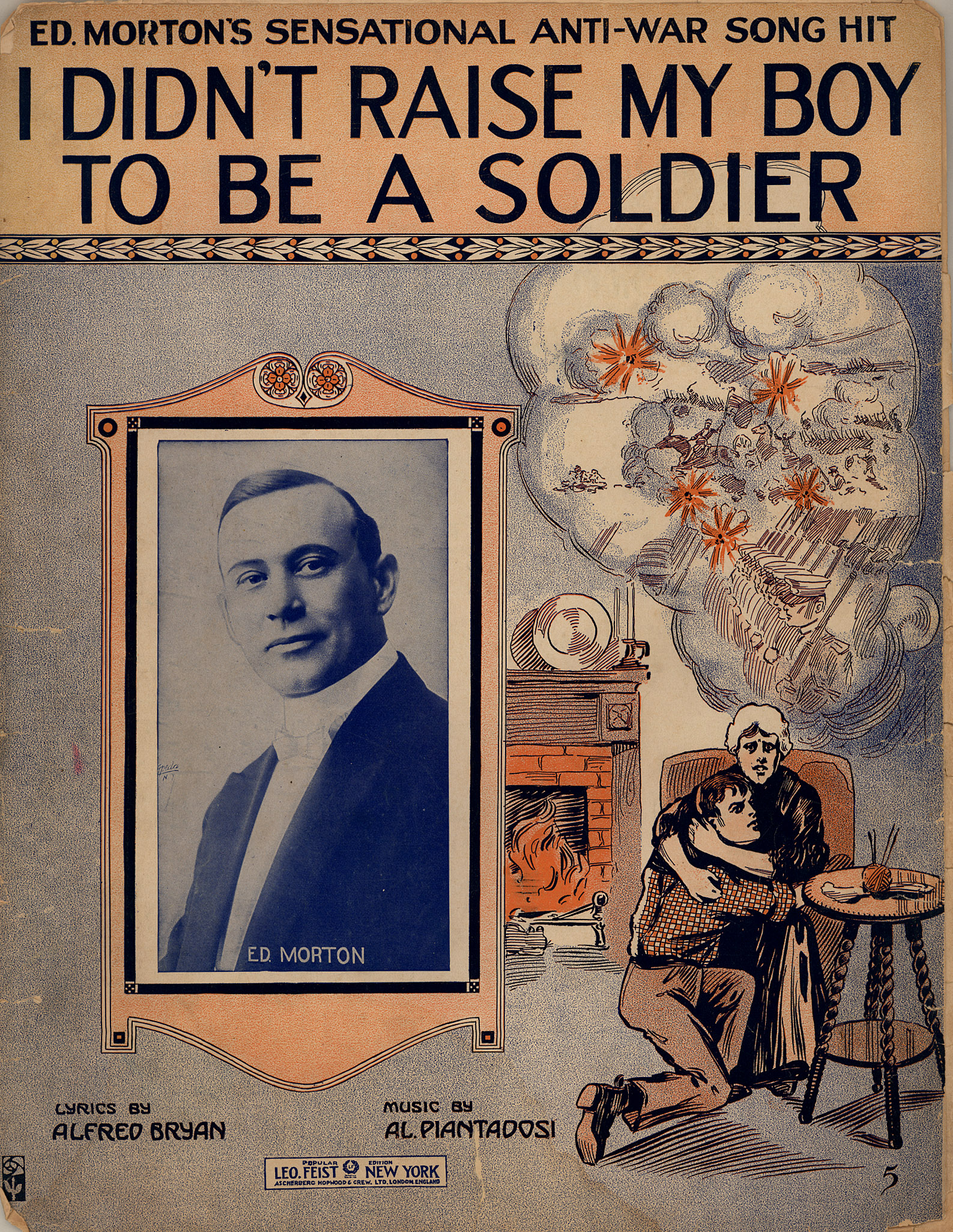
Alternate cover illustration

I Didn't Raise My Boy to Be a Soldier
"I Didn't Raise My Boy to Be a Soldier" sung by the Peerless Quartet in late 1914

"I Didn't Raise My Boy to Be a Soldier" is an American anti-war song that was influential within the pacifist movement that existed in the United States before it entered World War I. It is one of the first anti-war songs. Lyricist Alfred Bryan collaborated with composer Al Piantadosi in writing the song, which inspired a sequel, some imitations, but also a number of scornful parodies. It was recorded by The Peerless Quartet in December 1914 and was a hit in 1915, selling 650,000 copies. Its expression of popular pacifist sentiment "helped make the pacifist movement a hard, quantifiable political reality to be reckoned with."

== Themes ==
The song gives the lament of a lonely mother whose son has been lost in the war:

I didn't raise my boy to be a soldier,
I brought him up to be my pride and joy

She comments on the irony of war being between different mothers' sons, killing each other with muskets. Conflict between nations should be resolved by arbitration, not by the sword and the gun. Victory is not enough to console a mother for the loss of her son, and the blighting of her home. War would end if all mothers said they would not raise their sons as soldiers. The song thus apparently connects the suffragist and pacificist movements.

The somber nature of the lyrics also reflected the neutrality mentality that was common in the United States in early 1915.

== Impact and response ==
"I Didn't Raise My Boy to Be a Soldier" helped solidify the anti-war movement enough to make it politically relevant on the national stage. The song was in the top 20 charts from January to July 1915 and reached number 1 in March and April. The song's success and its resulting political strength brought supporters to the pacifist movement whose main priority was other issues. Unreconstructed Southerners appealed to popular distaste for the war in Europe in order to argue that the Civil War had been no more justified, and suffragists joined the peace movement because of its political potential and leverage in the campaign for women's right to vote. As with the later 1930s hit "God's Country", it shows that American popular music "generally reflects the isolationist tendencies of the public" and that pro-war songwriters were rarely successful.

"I Didn't Raise My Boy to Be a Soldier" was praised especially by anti-Britain groups in the United States – Irish, German, and Church ministers of many denominations. The song became known in a number of countries which were already at war – in Britain and in Australia notably.

== Other versions ==
In 1968 the Eli Radish Band recorded an updated Outlaw Country Rock version of the song to protest the Vietnam War. Their Capitol Records album bore the same title. Hamish Imlach released a version of the song on his 1987 album Sonny's Dream. The lyrics were altered for context, including reference to the British Empire.

== Political reactions ==
At the time, prominent politicians attacked the song both for its pacifism and early feminism. Theodore Roosevelt remarked that "foolish people who applaud a song entitled 'I Didn't Raise My Boy to Be a Soldier' are just the people who would also in their hearts applaud a song entitled 'I Didn't Raise My Girl to Be a Mother'". Roosevelt also wrote in a 1915 issue of Metropolitan Magazine that "As for the woman who approves the song, 'I Did Not Raise My Boy to be a Soldier,' her place is in China—by preference, in a harem in China—and not in the United States. Every woman who has not raised her boy to be a soldier at need has in unwomanly fashion striven to put a double burden on some other boy whose mother had a patriotic soul."

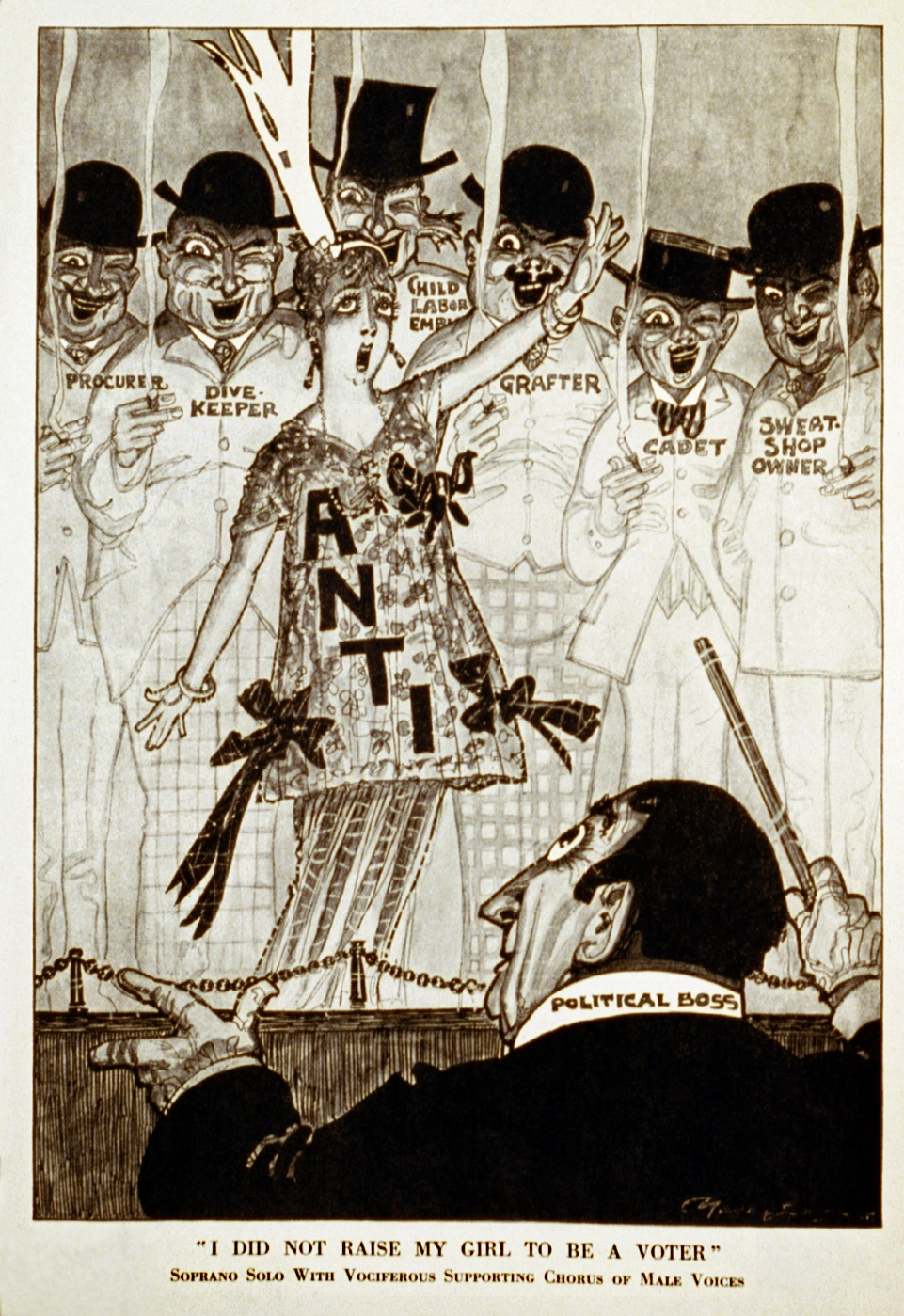
Cartoon "I did not raise my girl to be a voter" from Puck, October 1915. The cartoon satirizes opponents of female suffrage

Many parodies of the song were produced, such as "I Did Not Raise My Boy to Be a Coward" and "I Didn't Raise My Boy to Be a Soldier, but I'll Send My Girl to Be a Nurse." Parody poems and other responses were produced such as "They Didn't Raise Their Son to Be a Soldier", "I Didn't Raise My Dog to Be a Sausage", and "I Didn't Raise My Ford to Be a Jitney." According to Groucho Marx, a popular joke of the period concerned a poker game in which a cardplaying mother states "I didn't raise my boy, he had the joker".

== Original lyrics ==
Lyrics per original sheet music

Verse 1

Ten million soldiers to the war have gone,
Who may never return again.
Ten million mothers' hearts must break
For the ones who died in vain.
Head bowed down in sorrow
In her lonely years,
I heard a mother murmur thru' her tears:

Chorus

I didn't raise my boy to be a soldier,
I brought him up to be my pride and joy.
Who dares to place a musket on his shoulder,
To shoot some other mother's darling boy?
Let nations arbitrate their future troubles,
It's time to lay the sword and gun away.
There'd be no war today,
If mothers all would say,
"I didn't raise my boy to be a soldier."

Verse 2

What victory can cheer a mother's heart,
When she looks at her blighted home?
What victory can bring her back
All she cared to call her own?
Let each mother answer
In the years to be,
Remember that my boy belongs to me!

Repeat Chorus 2x

== See also ==
- List of anti-war songs
