= Somebody's Waiting for Someone =

1919 song written by Andrew B. Sterling and composed by Harry Von Tilzer

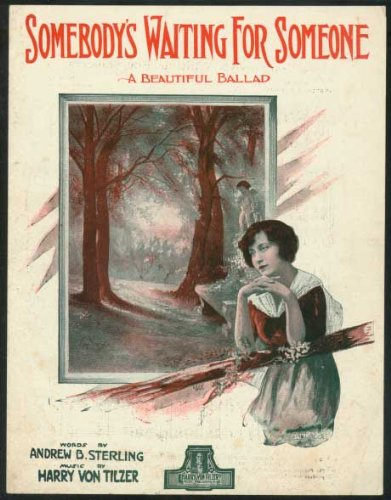
- Sheet music cover

Song
- Published: 1919
- Composer(s): Harry Von Tilzer
- Lyricist(s): Andrew B. Sterling

"Somebody's Waiting for Someone" is a 1919 song performed by Henry Burr and Albert Campbell. The music was composed by Harry Von Tilzer and the lyrics were written by Andrew B. Sterling. It was published by Harry Von Tilzer Publishing Co., and the sheet music cover featured an illustration by Albert Wilfred Barbelle. Based on sales estimates, it reached a peak position of No. 8 on Top 100 US songs of its time.

The song's cover art depicts a young woman leaning on a fence with a park scene to her right.
