= There's a Little Blue Star in the Window (and It Means All the World to Me) =

""There's a Little Blue Star in the Window (And it Means All the World to Me)""

Song
- Published: 1918
- Composer(s): F. Henri Klickmann
- Lyricist(s): Paul B. Armstrong

There's a Little Blue Star in the Window (And it Means All the World to Me) is a 1918 World War I song. Its lyrics were written by Paul B. Armstrong, and its music by F. Henri Klickmann. Henry Burr performed the piece, and it is among his top 15 Billboard hits. Frank K. Root & Co. of Chicago, Illinois published the song.

== Cover art and analysis ==
The sheet music cover shows an open window with a Blue Star service flag hanging in it. The lyrics are told from a mother's point of view, who looks at the blue star as a symbol for her son fighting overseas. The chorus reads:

There are stars in the high heavens shining
With a promise of hope in their light;
There are stars in the field of Old Glory,
The emblem of honor and Right.
But no star ever shone with more brightness,
I know,
Than the one for my boy o'er the sea.
There's a little blue star in the window,
And it means all the world to me.

The symbol of the little blue star was to signify those families who had sons fighting the war effort. There were various ways to represent the blue star: posters, banners, pins, and plaques. If the son was killed in action, the blue star was traded in for a gold star.
