= Jerome H. Remick and Company Building =

- U.S. National Register of Historic Places
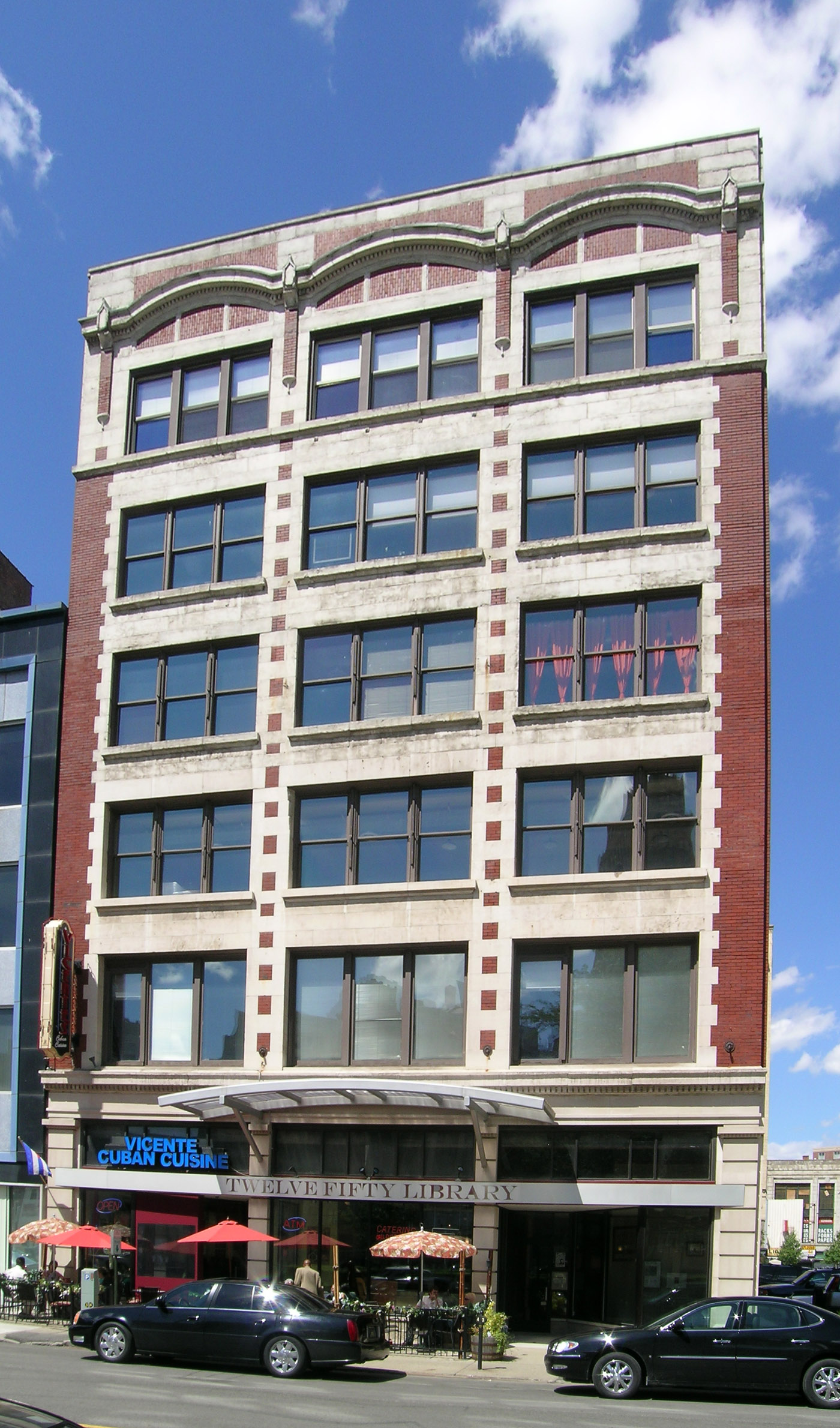
- Jerome H.Remick and Company Building from across Library Street
- Interactive map
- Location: 1250 Library Street; Detroit, Michigan
- Coordinates: 42°20′4″N 83°2′49″W
- Built: 1907
- Architect: Almon C. Varney
- Architectural style: Early Commercial
- NRHP reference No.: 96000804
- Added to NRHP: July 25, 1996

The Jerome H. Remick and Company Building is an early 20th-century office building located at 1250 Library Street in Downtown Detroit, Michigan. It later became an annex of the J. L. Hudson Company, and was listed on the National Register of Historic Places in 1996.

== History ==
The Jerome H. Remick & Company commissioned the three-story building in 1907. Remick was a leading publisher of ragtime music and housed his offices and printing facilities in the structure until 1915. Around this time, the upper three floors were added. Hudson's occupied the building in 1917, first to house its toy department and later as its music store. When the music merchandise was incorporated into Hudson's main store one-block west, the building was unused for several years until it became home of the Berry Rug Company for seven years beginning in 1935. In 1942, appliance retailer The Good Housekeeping Shop, opened and called the building home until the 1970s.

In 1992, Fieldstone Properties, owned by brothers Tom and David Carleton, purchased the building and immediately began construction of high-end residential lofts. To date, 6 residential lofts exist on the upper floors. Mindfield, a media company owned by the Carleton brothers and business partner Sean Emery, also occupies space in the building.

== Description ==
The Jerome H. Remick and Company Building is a six-story building of wood post and beam construction, with red brick walls and limestone detail work. The facade has three bays of triplet windows on all six floors.

== Current use ==
Vicente's Cuban Cuisine occupies the ground floor of the building, and the upper floors have been restored and are used as residential lofts.

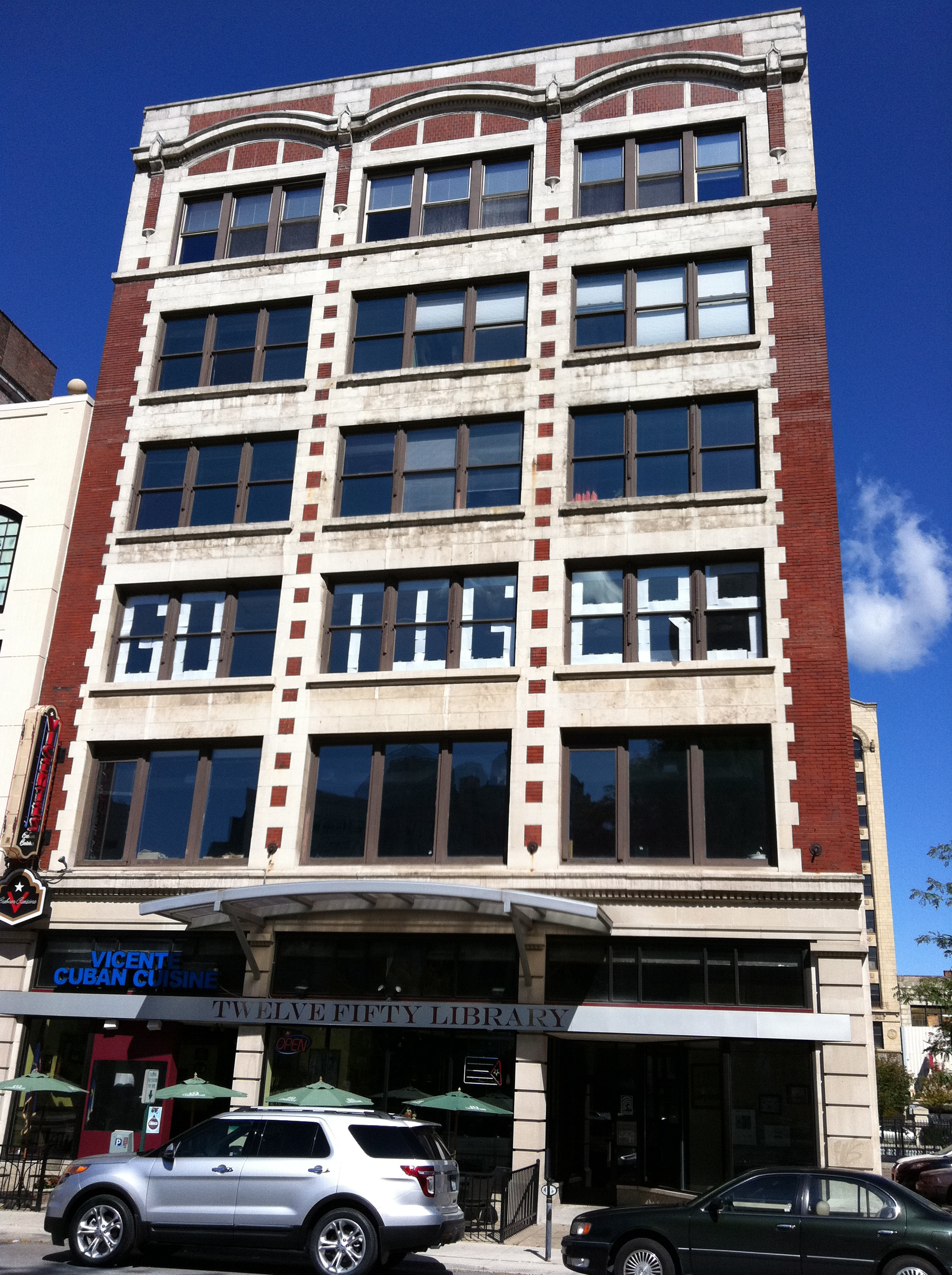
Go Tigers message adorns 3rd floor windows

On October 1, 2011, a resident of the lofts adorned the building's 3rd story windows with the message, GO TIGERS, in support of the Detroit Tigers, who were competing in Major League Baseball's postseason playoffs.
