= At the Devil's Ball =

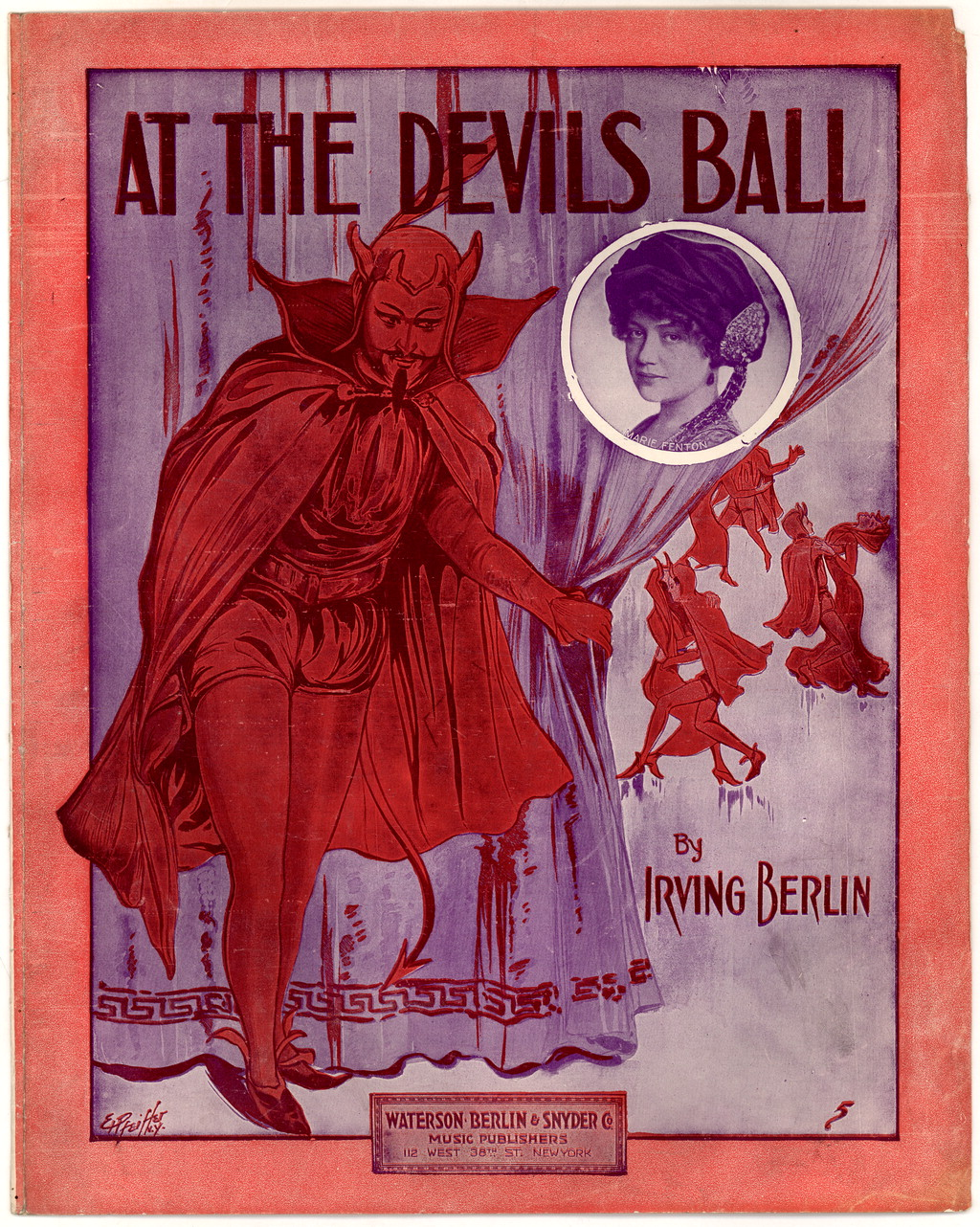
- Cover of the song's sheet music

Song
- Released: 1913
- Label: Columbia Records
- Songwriter: Irving Berlin

"At the Devil's Ball", also spelled "At the Devils Ball", is a song composed by Irving Berlin. There are three published editions of the song's lyrics—the first was registered for copyright on November 14, 1912; the second and third editions were registered on December 17, 1912, and January 8, 1913, respectively. The song's lyrics are written in first person, and convey a dream about a visit to a formal dance party in Hell, hosted by the Devil.

"At the Devil's Ball" has been recorded several times by different artists, most notably the version by the Peerless Quartet and Maurice Burkhart, which was recorded and released in 1913.

== Recordings ==
Several recordings of the song were produced in 1913. These include a version by the vocal group Peerless Quartet and singer Maurice Burkhart recorded in January 1913 and released in April, as well as a version by Victor Military Band also recorded in January and released in April; the latter recording was performed as part of a medley with another Berlin tune, "When the Midnight Choo-Choo Leaves for Alabam".

== Reception ==
Biographer James Kaplan referred to "At the Devil's Ball" as "sheer, surrealistic genius," and wrote that the song "[derives] its great good humor from the brilliantly homely details: a coat check at the entrance to hell; the cute Mrs. Devil in her beautiful fireman's hat; and the masterstroke, the mother-in-law dancing with Old Nick himself."

== In popular culture ==
The recording of the song featuring vocals by Maurice Burkhart was included on the soundtrack of the 2019 horror film Candy Corn.

The song was featured in the floor show of The Boulet Brothers' Dragula season 5 episode 3 titled Ghosts of the Gatehouse. The Boulet Brothers indicated this was one of their favorite songs both in the episode and in their recap podcast Creatures of the Night.
