= Clara Rees =

American composer born 1859

Clara H. Rees (born 1859) was an American composer and organist who composed instrumental works and at least one opera, but is best remembered for her songs.

Rees was born in Peoria, Illinois. Little is known about her education or personal life. At the time of the 1910 census, she was living with her sister and brother-in-law in Peoria and teaching voice. She served as an organist in at least three churches in Peoria: Christ Reformed Episcopal Church (one year); First Presbyterian Church (at least five years); and Universalist church (eight years).

Rees’ works were published by C. E. Hoffman Music Publishing Company and Jerome H. Remick & Co. She composed instrumental works and one opera as well as the following songs:

- Kiss Your Baby Bye Bye (text by Clara H. Rees; music by Richard Armstrong Whiting)
- Our Boys: March Song
- Somewhere
- Sunny Summertime (text by Clara H. Rees; music by Richard Armstrong Whiting)
- Thine Eyes Will Tell
- Waiting for You
- Yankee Doodle Dude
