= Edna White =

American musician (1892–1992)

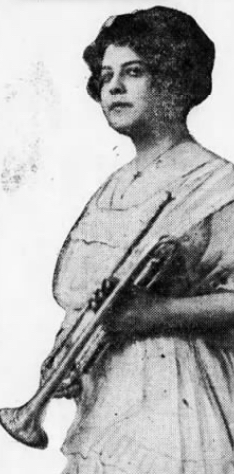
- Edna White, 1916.

Background information
- Also known as: Edna White Chandler
- Born: Flora Edna White; October 23, 1892; Stamford, Connecticut, United States
- Died: June 25, 1992 (aged 99) Greenfield, Massachusetts, United States
- Genres: Classical, vaudeville
- Occupations: Musician, composer, arranger
- Instrument: Trumpet
- Years active: 1901–57 (as performer), to 1980s (as composer), to 1990s (as author)
- Labels: Columbia Records, Edison Records
- Formerly of: Aida Quartet; Edna White Trumpet Quartet; Edna White Trumpeters; Gloria Trumpeters; Edna White Quartet; Liberty Belles
- Spouse(s): Myron H. Chandler (m. 1913; div. 1922); Torcum Bézazian (m. 1925; died 1981)

Flora Edna White (October 23, 1892 – June 25, 1992), known professionally as Edna White, was an American trumpet soloist, singer, vaudeville performer, and composer. A child prodigy, White began her professional career as a soloist in 1901 at the age of eight. She studied at the New York Institute of Musical Art in 1907. She was one of the first soloists to perform on trumpet rather than cornet.

White was billed as the "only woman solo trumpeter in the world". She created several all-female brass ensembles. In the 1920s, White made solo recordings for Edison Records. She collaborated with composers Virgil Thomson and George Antheil. Her 1949 recital in Carnegie Hall was the first given there by a trumpeter.

== Biography ==
=== Early life and education ===
Edna White was born in Stamford, Connecticut on October 23, 1892, to Herbert John White and Harriet Linwood Stone. She was the second of six children. Herbert was a mechanical engineer and an amateur cornetist who hoped for a son who would also play. Edna received her first cornet as a seventh birthday present.

By 1901 when the family moved to Brooklyn, Edna was talented enough to join her father at rehearsals for the Amacita Band. On May 3, 1901, she was the amateur ensemble's featured soloist at their annual Carnegie Hall concert, performing a tune from Gioachino Rossini's Stabat Mater and two encores.

The performance led to White's engagement as a soloist for the summer concert season at the popular seaside resort town of Ocean Grove, New Jersey. She performed there from 1901 to 1910. During the 1903 season, she studied with Anna Park and performed a duet with her. A typical Ocean Grove program featured hymns, airs, and variations.

In 1904, Frank Damrosch invited White to study at the New York Institute of Musical Art, which he established the following year. White studied with Adolphe Dubois, principal trumpet of the New York Symphony Orchestra. Dubois convinced White to switch from cornet to trumpet. He provided White with a glowing recommendation:

"I am happy to testify to the real talent of my pupil Edna White. Although but 14 years of age, she is already a very brilliant performer. To a very original expression, she adds a truly remarkable technique. The great success which she has already won proves this and indicates her for a brilliant artistic career."

White performed Raynaud's "Rapsodie Heroique" at the institute's 1907 commencement ceremony. She was not awarded a degree because of her age. The Juilliard School finally granted White an artist diploma in 1984.

=== Personal life ===
While living in Indiana, Edna White married Myron H. Chandler in 1913. They had a son named Douglas in 1917. She left Myron for the opera singer Torcum Bézazian in 1918. Myron refused to grant a divorce until 1923. In 1925, White and Bézazian married. They painfully separated in 1930 so that Bézazian could continue his career in Europe.

Edna White died in 1992, four months short of her 100th birthday.

== Career ==
=== The Aida Quartet ===
In 1908, White created the Trunette Concert Company with Florence McMillan on 2nd trumpet. Sisters Norma and Cora Sauter played the 3rd and 4th parts on cornet. The programmer at Ocean Grove loved them but forced a name change to The Aida Quartet. Florence doubled on piano, Norma on violin, and Cora on cello. Beginning in 1910, the Redpath Lyceum Bureau sent the Aida Quartet on tour with baritone C. Pol Plancon for three seasons in a row. White earned $75 per week and the tour went to Texas, Iowa, Nevada, Nebraska, the Dakotas, and Kansas.

Their touring repertoire relied heavily on arrangements of light classical music like Johannes Brahms' Hungarian Dances and highlights from operas such as Tannhäuser and Aida.

The Sauters accused White of having an affair with Plancon, and the group disbanded by 1913. White moved to her parents' home in Indianapolis. When she broke her contract with the Redpath Lyceum Bureau, they blacklisted her for several years.

=== World War I and the 1920s ===
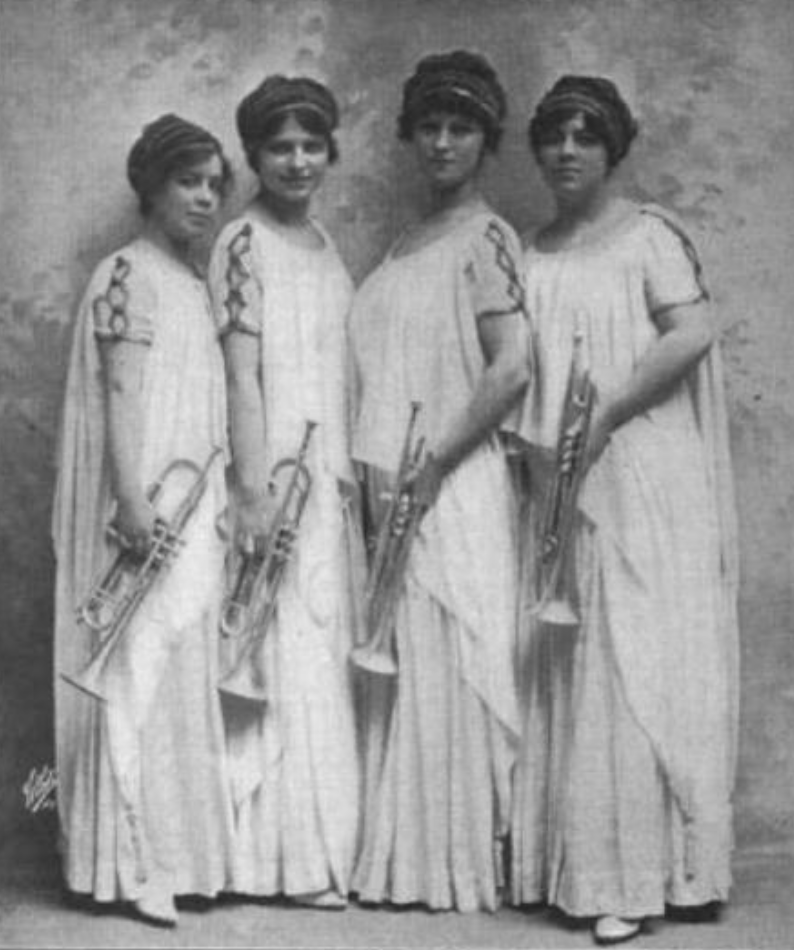
The Edna White Trumpet Quartet, 1916.

When her husband's foreign bank accounts were frozen during World War I, White responded to their financial hardship by organizing the Edna White Trumpeters.

In 1915, the ensemble demonstrated the power of telephony by performing in the offices of the Brooklyn Eagle on a call with the San Francisco Examiner. The Edna White Trumpeters performed at the Panama-Pacific Exposition in San Francisco, where Edna also filled in as a soloist with the Mexican National Band.

Since there was not much trumpet quartet music, the ensemble had to arrange compositions to create their own repertoire. They also marketed themselves as suitable replacements for an orchestra or organ during performances of sacred works like Alfred Gaul's Holy City and Handel's Messiah.

Edna left the group when she got pregnant in 1916. They kept performing with Katherine Rankin playing Edna's parts. The Edna White Trumpeters' recorded for Columbia Records without their founder, including the hit "Just a Baby's Prayer at Twilight (For Her Daddy Over There)". She reclaimed the rights to her ensemble's name and formed a new group she called the Gloria Trumpeters.

Edison Records contracted White to make several recordings such as Herbert L. Clarke's "The Debutante". In 1921, she went on tour with the Premiere Artists, a women's brass trio, and broke off her Edison contract. That same year, she and Torcum Bézazian began touring the Keith-Albee Vaudeville circuit. The nine years she spent as a vaudevillian were the fondest memories of her career and the subject of her memoir. She also performed summer concerts in Rochester, New York, featuring cornet solo repertoire by Jules Levy, John Hartmann, Herbert L. Clarke, Bohumir Kryl, and Jean-Baptiste Arban. In 1924, the Redpath Bureau booked the Edna White Trumpeters as a touring act.

In 1926, White formed another female brass quartet called the Liberty Belles, featuring two trumpets and two trombones. The following year, she and her husband traveled to Paris where she studied voice. In 1928, she returned to the U.S. and the vaudeville circuit, leading a big band as both singer and trumpeter. She also performed with the Edna White Quartet, which toured for Redpath and performed under contract for WABC radio.

=== The 1930s and 1940s ===
The Edna White Quartet was still performing in 1931, including broadcasts on WOR in New York City. White created another quartet called the Cathedral Trumpeters in 1931. She contracted scarlet fever after the summer concert season. She was well enough to perform Wallingford Riegger's orchestration of Guy Ropartz' Andante et Allegro on February 7, 1932 with the Manhattan Symphony Orchestra.

John Philip Sousa attended the performance and invited White to perform with his band, but he died a month later. Vincent Bach sent White a congratulatory note after the concert. Shortly afterward, White appeared with the Philip James Little Symphony and embarked on a tour with her quartet. White had a heart attack early in the tour, ending it prematurely.

White tried to create the Gotham Music School in October 1933 but was forced to declare bankruptcy when it failed. She briefly worked in retail before receiving a sponsorship from the Federal Music Project and the Works Progress Administration. She sang more frequently in productions like Horse Eats Hat with the New York City Theater Project and Victor Herbert's Naughty Marietta and Babes in Toyland with Colin O'More's Light Opera. She also created another brass quartet called The Tone Weavers which was active until 1942. She performed with Signore Creatore's Little Symphony of Women and the Montreal Women's Symphony Orchestra. She made ends meet by teaching lessons. She also taught English, music, and drama at the New Jersey Military Academy in Freehold.

=== Carnegie Hall recitals ===
White's son urged her to perform at Carnegie Hall. She rented the venue by writing a bad check, which she was able to make good on with the proceeds from the concert on February 19, 1949. The Tietjien Chorus and pianist Conrad Bos joined White on a program that featured the American premiere of Henri Martelli's Sonatine, Gena Branscombe's Procession, George Enescu's Légende, Tibor Serly's Midnight Madrigal, and the world premier of Virgil Thomson's "Concert Waltz (At the Beach)" which was written for the occasion.

The New York Herald Tribune raved, "There seems nothing that [White] cannot attain with her instrument, and she looked an impressive figure in her blue velvet, and with a rack of 'spare' trumpets beside her, gleaming as golden as her hair." The New York Times noted her muddy articulation during soft passages but praised her "musicianly attributes, among them a good sense of pitch and a powerful, brilliant fortissimo tone".

As intended, the recital led to increased bookings including a performance of "Flight of the Bumblebee" on the CBS television program We the People, solos with Edwin Franko Goldman's band, and a 37-week tour of military hospitals.

On February 20, 1954, White premiered George Antheil's Sonata for trumpet and piano at a Composer's Forum moderated by Aaron Copland at Columbia University. In November 1954, White appeared in a concert given by the Early Music Foundation at Carnegie Recital Hall, performing music by Johann Hermann Schein, Joseph Schmidt, and Johann Christoph Pezel.

White returned to Carnegie Hall for a retirement concert called "Farewell to My Trumpet" on February 17, 1957. The program included Thomson's "At the Beach," the "Inflammatus" from Rossini's Stabat Mater, "The Carnival of Venice" with variations by Arban, Clarke, and White. The New York Times wrote, "Despite the long career, Miss White retains to an impressive degree the fire and dash of the true virtuoso trumpeter".

=== Retirement ===
White remained active as a composer and writer when she was done performing. In 1958, she wrote the music and libretto for an operetta called Hills of Tennessee. She also composed a Suite for Solo Trumpet and Symphony Orchestra which was premiered in 1980 by trumpeter Stephen Schaffner and the Pioneer Valley Symphony. It was recorded by Gaeton Berton with the Maryland Theater Orchestra.

From 1958–60, White wrote a weekly newspaper column. She also worked as a promoter for a record label and created Trumpet Production to publish her own work. White wrote two method books: The Trumpet Teacher and On Taming the Devil's Tongue (1983). She published several poetry books, and in 1990 she penned a memoir about her time as a vaudevillian, The Night the Camel Sang: A True Romance of Vaudeville.

== Significance and legacy ==
White's career reflected, and often pushed, the development of the trumpet as a solo instrument through the 20th century. White's switch from cornet to trumpet was unusual at the time. In a 1990 interview, White recalled, "When I started, nobody played the trumpet. Everybody played the cornet. Later on more and more people began playing trumpet, but I made the switch before most because of my study with Dubois." Like her contemporaries Rafael Mendez and Timofei Dokshitzer, White employed a "violinistic" style of playing with extravagant vibrato.

When White rented Carnegie Hall in 1949, she was the first trumpeter to do so. While Armando Ghitalla is seen as a pioneer of trumpet recitals because of his performances at the Town Hall (1958) and Carnegie Hall (1960), White predated his efforts by a decade.
