= Henry Burr =

Musical artist (1882–1941)

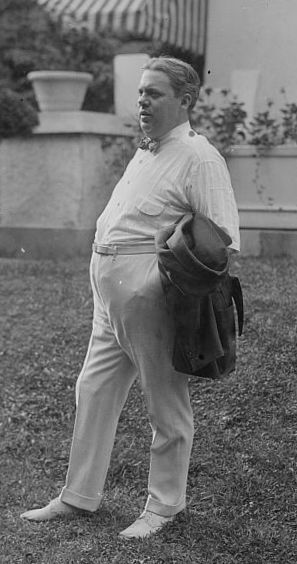
- Burr in 1918

Background information
- Also known as: Irving Gillette, Henry Gillette, Alfred Alexander, Robert Rice, Carl Ely, Harry Barr, Frank Knapp, Al King, Shamus McClaskey
- Born: Harry Haley McClaskey; January 15, 1882; St. Stephen, New Brunswick, Canada
- Died: April 6, 1941 (aged 59) Chicago, Illinois, U.S.
- Genre: vocal
- Occupation: Singer
- Years active: 1887–1941
- Labels: Columbia, Victor

Henry Burr (January 15, 1882 – April 6, 1941) was a Canadian singer, radio performer and producer. He was born Harry Haley McClaskey and used Henry Burr as one of his many pseudonyms, in addition to Irving Gillette, Henry Gillette, Alfred Alexander, Robert Rice, Carl Ely, Harry Barr, Frank Knapp, Al King, and Shamus McClaskey. He produced more than 12,000 recordings, by his own estimate, and some of his most popular recordings included "Just a Baby's Prayer at Twilight", "Till We Meet Again" with Albert Campbell, "Beautiful Ohio", "I Wonder Who's Kissing Her Now" "When I Lost You" and "In The Shade of the Old Apple Tree". A tenor, he performed as a soloist and in duets, trios and quartets.

== Early years ==
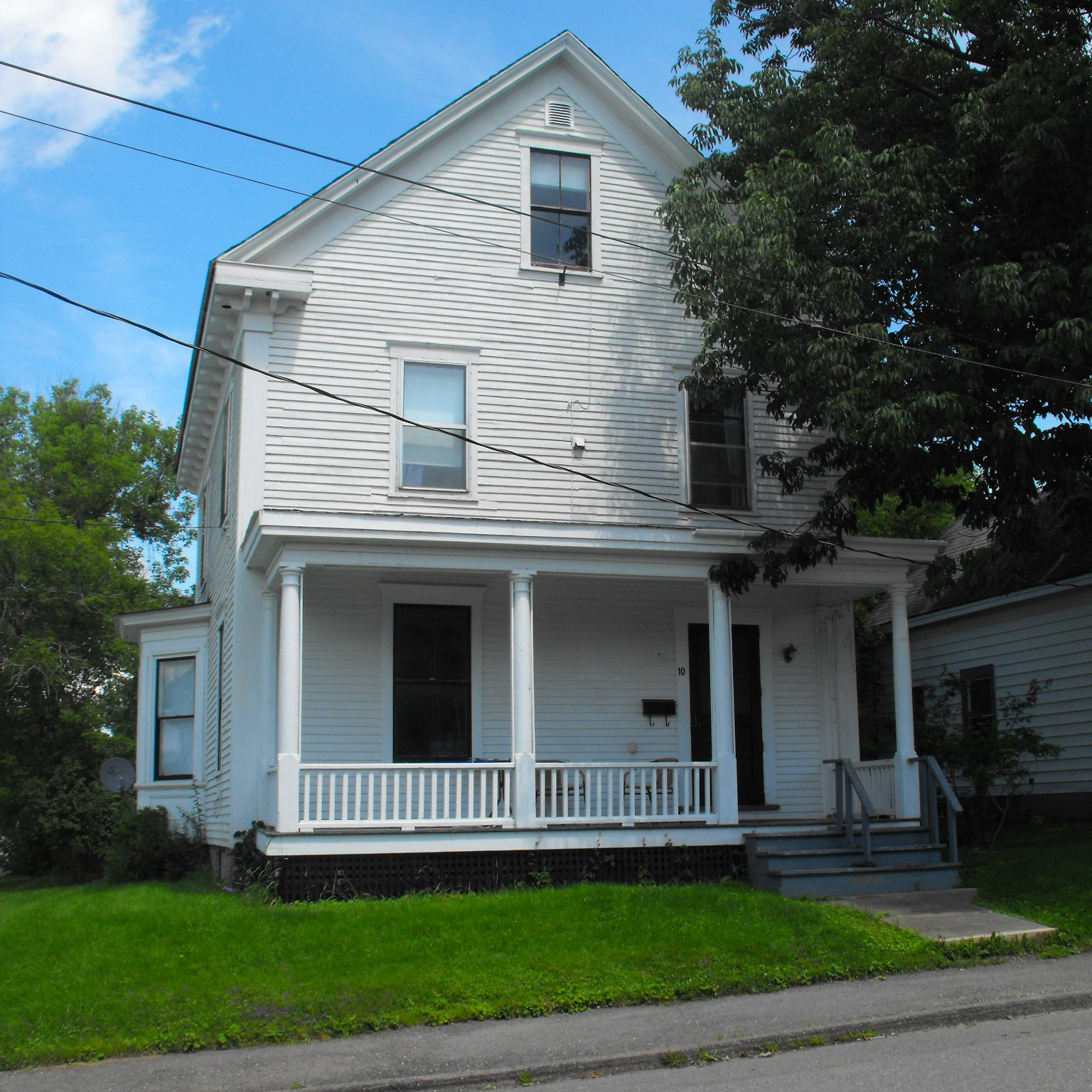
Burr's childhood home in St. Stephen, New Brunswick.

Born in the border town of St. Stephen, New Brunswick, Canada, Harry McClaskey was the son of a candy and tobacco store owner, A. A. McClaskey. His mother was the former Ida Connors and he was the youngest of four children. His vocal talents were recognized early and by the age of 5 he was performing publicly in St. Stephen. At age 10 he was the mascot for the Saint John Bicycle and Athletic Club in the nearby city of Saint John, singing "Her Eyes Don't Shine Like Diamonds" and at age 13 he was performing onstage as a boy tenor with the Artillery Band in Saint John. The family had moved to Saint John by this time. Perhaps doubting that he could make a career in music, he later attended Mt. Allison Academy in Sackville, New Brunswick, and afterward worked for his father.

== Music ==
Burr singing "O Canada" in 1914

On April 14, 1901, Burr appeared at the opera house in Saint John in his first notable concert with the Scottish soprano Jessie MacLachlan. On September 30, he was discovered by the Metropolitan Opera baritone Giuseppe Campanari who was in Saint John to perform at the St. John Opera House. Campanari insisted that McClaskey go to New York for musical training.

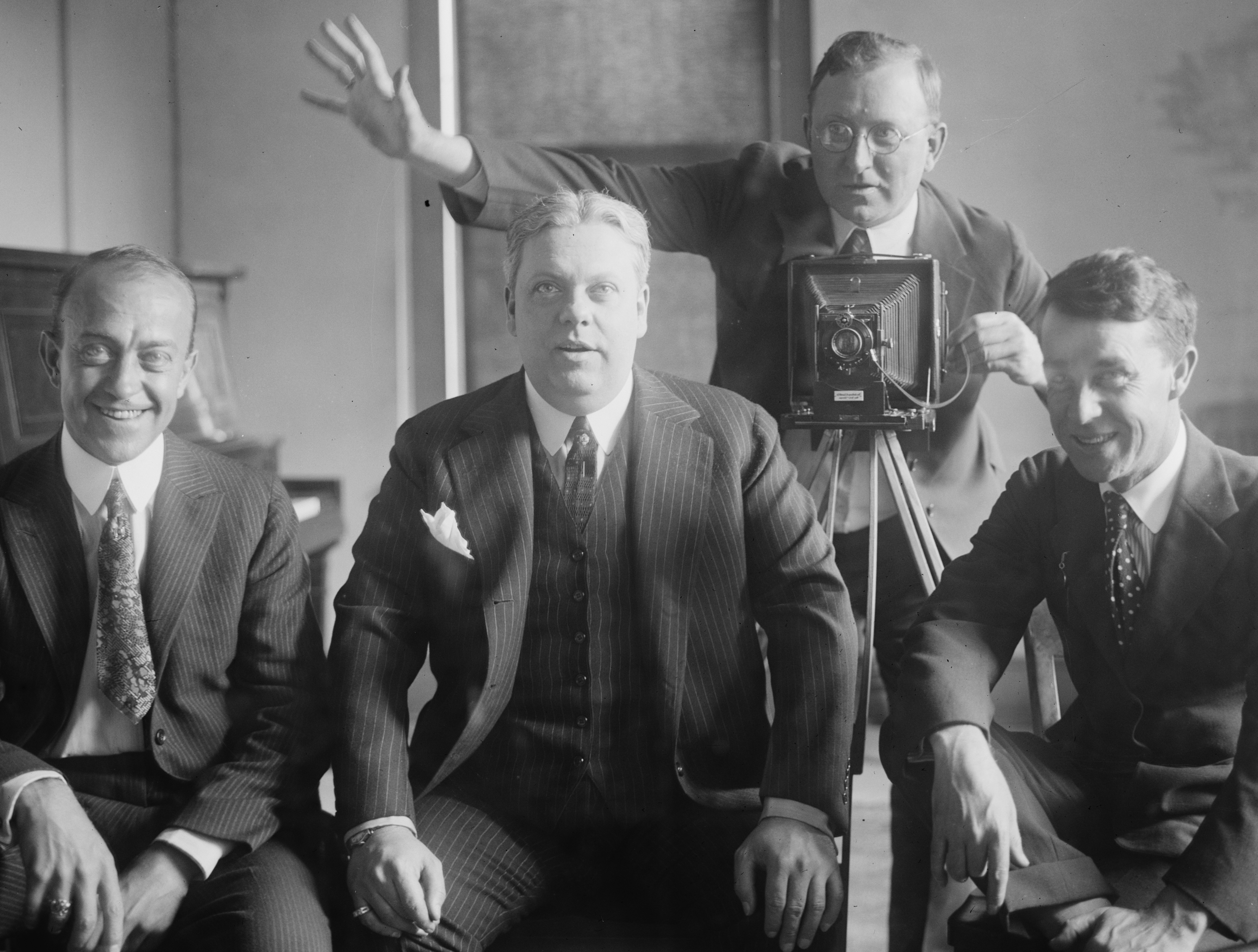
Henry Burr and the Peerless Quartet in 1922. From left to right: John H. Meyer, Burr, Frank Croxton, Albert Campbell.

Emboldened by Campanari's endorsement, McClaskey ventured to New York in 1902, where he began lessons and sang with the Grace Methodist Episcopal Church choir. He eventually rose to tenor soloist for the choir. His teachers included John Dennis Meehan (or Mehan) and Kate Stella Burr, from whom he would adopt his stage name in her honor.

Around 1902 he started to record with Columbia Records as Henry Burr. He arrived at a particularly opportune time, as star tenor, George J. Gaskin, was in the final years of his career. Burr started recording for Edison Records in November 1904 under the name Irving Gillette. Disagreements with company executives resulted in his no longer recording for Edison after October 1914. He first recorded with Victor on January 4, 1905, and the recordings were released that March. On April 7, 1905, he recorded Egbert Van Alstyne's "In the Shade of the Old Apple Tree" which proved to be popular. It was also recorded by Billy Murray the same year. Burr proved to be a successful artist, recording thousands of songs for various labels under various names. In particular, he was very popular in the 1910s, as he had the most #1 hits in the decade, according to Joel Whitburn's research. His most successful recording was of "Just a Baby's Prayer at Twilight", which eventually sold a million copies. His total recordings were estimated to have sold around 240 million records. He would record with Leeds Talk-O-Phone, Angelophone and the American Record Company as well. His recordings also appear on International Record Company and department store labels such as Vim Records.

=== Collaborations ===
In 1906, Burr joined the Columbia Male Quartet, which was recording for the Columbia Record Company, as second tenor under the management of Frank C. Stanley. They were later renamed the Peerless Quartet when they moved to the Victor label. When Stanley died in 1910, Burr took over management of the group. It continued on as a popular recording and live group (with various personnel and name changes over the years) until 1928, when it disbanded. Burr was also a member of the Metropolitan Trio and the Manhattan Mixed Trio, both of which featured him with Frank C. Stanley and Elise Stevenson. In 1921, he contributed music to a summertime review called The Broadway Whirl.

Burr recorded in a duo with Albert Campbell. The pair had a succession of hits between 1911 and 1925, including "The Trail of the Lonesome Pine" (1913), "Somebody's Waiting for Someone" (1919), "Till We Meet Again" (1919), and "I'm Forever Blowing Bubbles" (1919).

== Business ==
By 1915, he was in a comfortable position financially, and he began to seek ways to invest his money. That year, he formed the Paroquette Record Manufacturing Company with Fred Van Eps, based in New York City. The Paroquette system used vertical cut records and featured his own recordings and those of several other performers. As a novel introduction in a highly competitive market, the Paroquette recording technique was an early failure, and the company was out of business by 1917. Burr also tried music publishing, and he also shared ownership in a banjo factory with Van Eps for a short while.

== Early radio ==
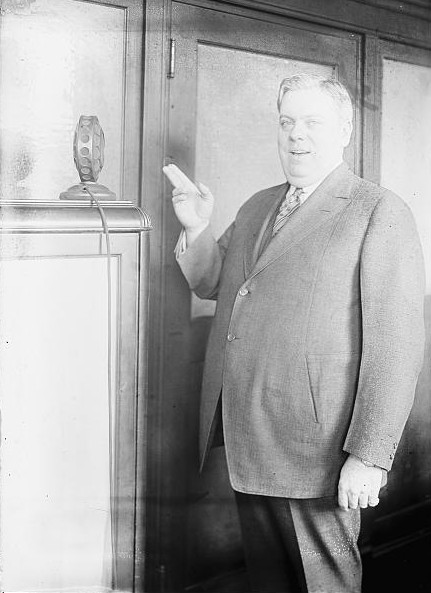
Burr with microphone.

Burr performed live on the radio while broadcasting technology was still in its infancy. He made his first appearance in 1920 in Denver, Colorado using a microphone improvised from a wooden bowl with an inverted telephone transmitter. The broadcast was heard as far west as San Francisco. Burr is also credited with making the first transcontinental 'broadcast' by singing into the telephone in New York and being heard by diners wearing headphones at a Rotary dinner in California. Also in 1920, he signed an exclusive contract with Victor that lasted seven years. A lucrative contract, it made him (for a time) a wealthy man.

By the late 1920s, Burr's recording career was over. Electrical recording technologies had encouraged the crooner style of tenor vocals, as in the singing of Gene Austin and Al Bowlly. The commercial potential of radio continued to interest Burr. He became involved in programming, forming Henry Burr, Inc. in 1928 as a producer. He produced numerous programs for commercial radio networks into the 1930s. He originated the Cities Service broadcast, which he produced for two years.

In October 1929, he reportedly lost a substantial portion of his wealth in the Wall Street crash of 1929. Within a month, he was appointed Director of the Artist's Bureau at CBS which had just been organized under the ownership of William S. Paley.

Around 1935, he returned to performing on the radio as a member of the WLS Chicago National Barn Dance troupe, which was broadcast over NBC on Saturday evenings. He soon became a featured performer on the show, which he stayed with for five years until shortly before his death.

== Death ==
Burr died of throat cancer in Chicago, Illinois on April 6, 1941. Buried near his stepdaughter Marguarite in Mount Vernon, New York, where he had lived, he was survived by his wife, Cecilia. His widow died of a heart ailment in 1954 in Arlington Heights, Illinois.

== Cultural references ==
Burr's 1915 recording of "There's a Little Spark of Love Still Burning" was used on Ernie Kovacs' Eugene special in 1960, and possibly on other Kovacs programs as well.

In the 1960s, the famous ukulele-playing singer Tiny Tim frequently played Burr songs on stage and on such programs as The Johnny Carson Show.

Although Burr is rarely heard today in mainstream musical culture, his 1922 rendition of "My Buddy" was used on the soundtrack of a Boardwalk Empire episode, originally broadcast on October 8, 2012 (Season 3, Episode 4, "Blue Bell Boy"), and his song All on Account of You was featured on the title screen of the 2024 indie game Mirror Mirror.

== See also ==
- The Haydn Quartet
- 1903 in music
- 1909 in music
- 1918 in music
- 1922 in music
- "Peg o' My Heart"
- "I'm Forever Blowing Bubbles"
- American Record Company
- "There's a Little Blue Star in the Window (and It Means All the World to Me)"

== Audio ==
- When you and I were young, Maggie (1916 solo performance) from Virtual Gramophone at Library and Archives Canada.
- Samples from Archeophone Records
- Henry Burr recordings, from the UCSB Cylinder Audio Archive at the University of California, Santa Barbara Library.
