= Vess Ossman =

American musician (1868–1923)

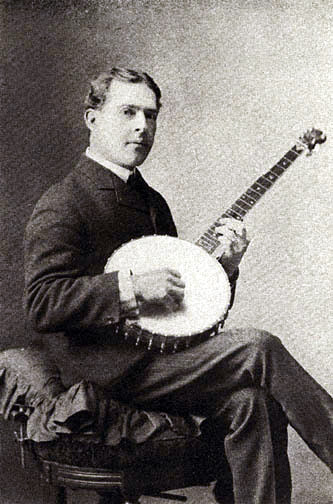

Background information
- Birth name: Sylvester Louis Ossman
- Born: August 21, 1868; Hudson, New York, U.S.
- Died: December 7, 1923 (aged 55); Fairmont, Minnesota
- Genres: Pop; ragtime; dance band
- Occupation: Musician
- Instrument: Banjo
- Years active: 1893–1923
- Labels: Columbia, Vim
- The Buffalo Rag Written by Tom Turpin (1904), performed by Ossman in 1906

Sylvester Louis "Vess" Ossman (August 21, 1868 – December 7, 1923) was a leading five-string banjoist and popular recording artist of the early 20th century.

== Biography ==
Sylvester Louis Ossman was born in Hudson, New York, and made his first recordings in 1893. He became one of the most recorded musicians of his day, recording marches, cakewalks, and rags. He also accompanied popular singers, such as Arthur Collins and Len Spencer.

Ossman married Eunice Smith and they had three children, Vess Jr., Raymond, and Annadele.

In 1900 and 1903, when Ossman's reputation and fame had spread internationally, he toured England and recorded. With the brothers Audley and George Dudley he performed in the Ossman-Dudley Trio. He led his own dance band, the Ossman's Singing and Playing Orchestra, in Dayton, Ohio, and Indianapolis, Indiana. The increasing popularity of his rival Fred Van Eps, after 1910, made Ossman's name appear less frequently in record company supplements. He temporarily ceased recording in 1913 but resumed in late 1915. In April 1917, he became a member of the Popular Talking Machine Artists, a group of unrelated musicians who toured as an act. By the early 1920s, he had left the touring act.

On December 14, 1917 he made his final recordings for Columbia Records. He continued to travel with his dance orchestra, working in hotels throughout Midwest while living in Dayton with his family. In 1923, he joined B. F. Keith's Vaudeville houses on tour with his son, Vess Jr. At a theater show in Minneapolis, Ossman suffered a heart attack. He was brought to the hospital but soon returned to the show. Later, in Fairmont, Minnesota, he suffered another heart attack, this time fatal, after his last performance on stage. He was buried in Valhalla Cemetery in St. Louis, Missouri.

Ossman played in what is now known as the classic banjo style. He fingerpicked gut strings using a technique similar to classical guitarists.

His recordings include "St. Louis Tickle", "Yankee Doodle", "Rusty Rags", "Maple Leaf Rag", "Spaghetti Rag", "The Stars and Stripes Forever", "A Bit of Blarney", "My Irish Molly O", "A Gay Gosson", "Yankee Girl", "Bill Simmons", "Karama" and "Tell Me Pretty Maiden". His recordings also include ragtime-era coon songs, such as "A Coon Band Contest", "The Darkies' Awakening", and Ernest Hogan's "All Coons Look Alike to Me", which were popular at the time.

== See also ==
- Vim Records
