= Six Brown Brothers =

Canadian vaudeville-era saxophone sextet

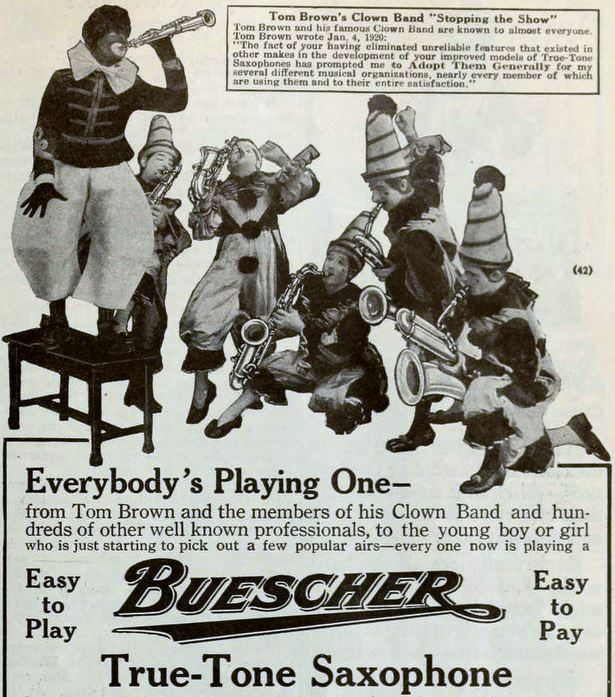
- Top portion of an ad with Tom Brown in blackface and his clown band, the Six Brown Brothers, for the 1920 Broadway musical Tip Top.

Background information
- Origin: Lindsay, Ontario, Canada
- Genre: Vaudeville
- Years active: 1913–1933
- Past members: William Brown; Tom Brown; Alec Brown; Percy Brown; Fred Brown; Vern Brown

The Six Brown Brothers, later known as the Five Brown Brothers, were a Canadian vaudeville era saxophone sextet consisting of six brothers. They were known for their comedic musical acts as well as their many recordings. They performed as clowns with white makeup and one in blackface. Their performances included ragtime and minstrel group acts; they were instrumental in popularizing the saxophone in North America: "During the first two decades of the 20th century, the Six Brown Brothers were arguably the musical act most responsible for introducing the saxophone into American music."

== History ==
"That Moaning Saxophone Rag"

"Bull Frog Blues" (1916)

The brothers comprising the Six Brown Brothers were, William, Tom (1881–1950), Alec, Percy, Fred, and Vern Brown. The band was led by Tom Brown. (Additional non-family members also played with the group.) The Brown Brothers lived in Lindsay, Ontario until 1893. The first instrumentation consisted of a saxophone quintet (bass, baritone, tenor, and 2 alto saxes), and in 1913 they added a second baritone sax. A soprano sax was never used with the group except as a feature for Tom Brown. The group began working at circuses, and later worked in minstrel and vaudeville shows, and then on Broadway. The brothers often performed dressed in clown outfits. The group toured in 1912-14 with Primrose and Dockstader's Minstrels, later toured Scotland and elsewhere in Europe, and in 1925 toured Australia. They broke up in 1933, and only Tom Brown continued as a musician but with limited success.

Between 1911 and 1920 the brothers recorded a number of well-known songs, including "Walking the Dog" and, in 1917, one of the earliest recordings of the hit "Darktown Strutters' Ball". Music critic and composer Alec Wilder writes that "When I first heard the Six Brown Brothers' (six saxophones) record of this song many years ago, I knew I was listening to something special." Though Wilder's comment focuses on Shelton Brooks's composition, it reinforces that the Six Brown Brothers' recordings were of high quality.

In his celebrated essay "The Years of Wonder" (1961), E.B. White retells his adventures in 1923 aboard a steamer bound for Alaska on which the Six Brown Brothers were engaged as musical entertainment. White describes an encounter in which the group plays for Inuit in Alaska: "Later, the six Brown Brothers unlimbered their horns, and the Eskimos danced, with surprising frenzy. None of them had ever heard a sax, and the sound made them drunk."

In 2004, a collection of the Six Brown Brothers' recordings, That Moaning Saxophone, was released in CD format. That year a book about the group's career, That Moaning Saxophone: The Six Brown Brothers and the Dawning of a Musical Craze, written by Bruce Vermazien, was published by Oxford University Press.
