= Peerless Quartet =

American vocal group

The Peerless Quartet
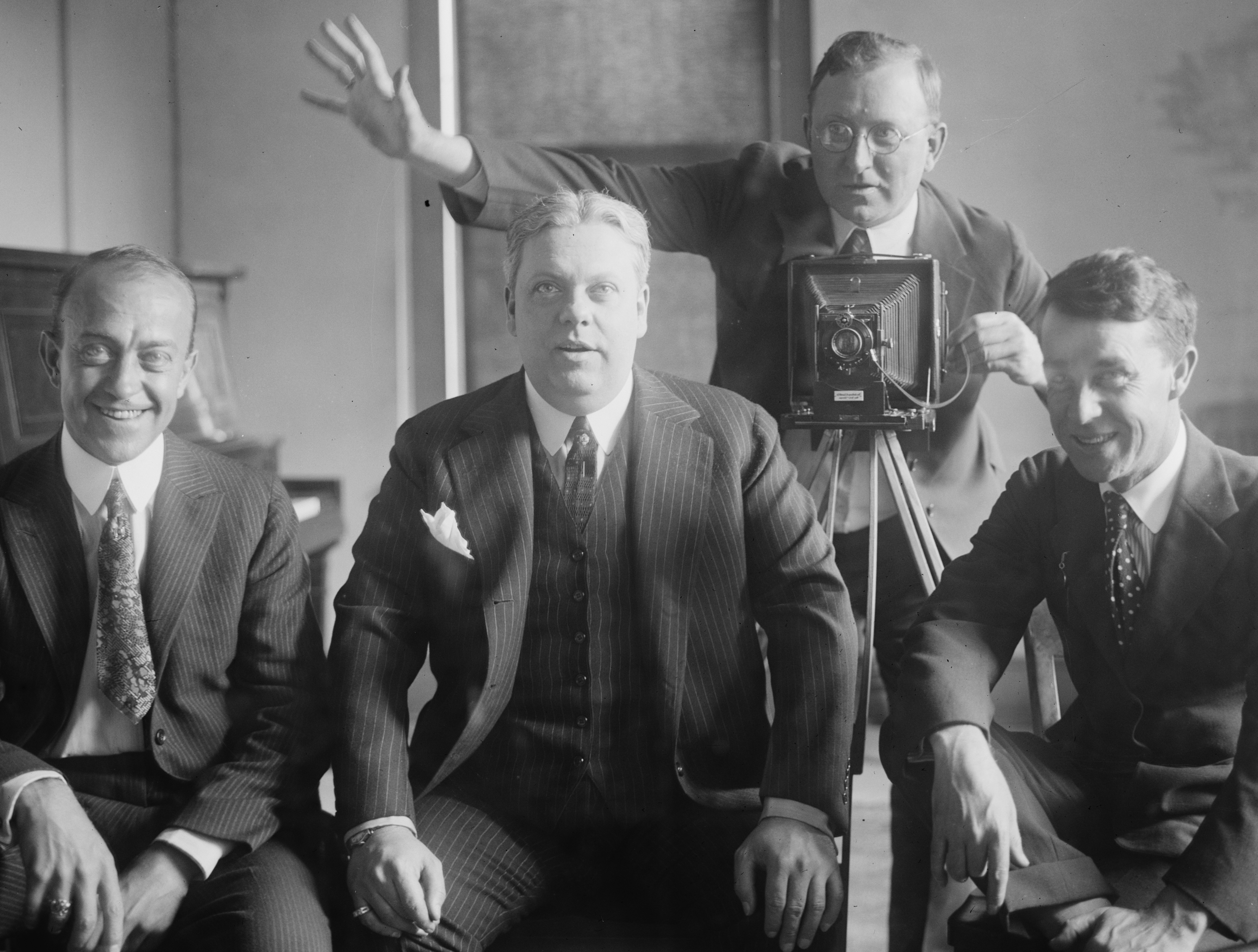
- The Peerless Quartet in 1922; L-R: John H. Meyer, Henry Burr, Frank Croxton, Albert Campbell

Background information
- Also known as: The Columbia (Male) Quartet; The Climax Quartette
- Origin: New York City, U.S.
- Genres: Vocal group
- Years active: 1890s–1928
- Labels: Columbia, Victor, Edison, Zonophone
- Past members: Albert Campbell; Henry Burr; James Stanley; Steve Porter; Arthur Collins; John H. Meyer; Frank Croxton; Carl Mathieu; Stanley Baughman; Frank C. Stanley

The Peerless Quartet was an American vocal group that recorded in the early years of the twentieth century. They formed to record for Columbia Records, where they were credited as the Columbia Quartet or Columbia Male Quartet. From about 1907, when they began to record for record labels other than Columbia, they were more widely known as the Peerless Quartet.

The Peerless Quartet was one of the most commercially successful groups of the acoustic era and made hundreds of recordings, including popular versions of songs such as "Sweet Adeline", "By the Light of the Silvery Moon", "Let Me Call You Sweetheart", and "I Want A Girl (Just Like The Girl That Married Dear Old Dad)". The group continued to record until 1928, with many changes of personnel. They were led until 1910 by Frank C. Stanley, and thereafter by tenor Henry Burr.

== History ==
=== Formation and early years, 1890s–1910 ===
The first cylinder recordings by the Columbia Male Quartet (or Quartette) were made in the late 1890s. The earliest version of the group included first tenor Albert Campbell, second tenor James Kent "Jim" Reynard, baritone Joe Belmont and bass Joe Majors. The same line-up also recorded in 1901–02 as the Climax Quartette for Climax discs, a predecessor of Columbia's own discs, although later recordings under that name were by a different group. Over the next few years, Reynard was first replaced by George J. Gaskin, and then, around 1902, by Henry Burr. Majors was first replaced by Tom Daniels and then, in about 1903, by Frank C. Stanley. On some recordings, Belmont was replaced by Arthur Collins or Bob Roberts.

By 1904, the group's membership had stabilized as tenors Albert Campbell and Henry Burr, baritone Steve Porter, and bass Frank C. Stanley. Frank Stanley (born William Stanley Grinsted) became the group's lead singer and manager, and, as freelance musicians, the group began recording for other labels as well as Columbia. They recorded as the Peerless Quartet for Zonophone from 1907; for the Victor Talking Machine Company from 1908; and for Edison's National Phonograph Company from 1909. The group's most successful early recordings included "You're The Flower of My Heart, Sweet Adeline" for Columbia in 1904, and "Honey Boy" for Columbia and Zonophone in 1907. In 1909, Arthur Collins replaced Steve Porter, who continued to record as a solo performer and in duos. They continued to have success in 1910, notably with "By the Light of the Silvery Moon", which they recorded for Columbia, Zonophone, and Everlasting, and "Silver Bell", recorded for Victor and Everlasting.

=== Peak of success, 1910–1918 ===
I Didn't Raise my Boy to be a Soldier
"I Didn't Raise my Boy to be a Soldier" sung by the Peerless Quartet in late 1914.

I'm Coming Back to Dixie and You
"I'm Coming Back to Dixie and You" performed by the Peerless Quartet in 1914. Written by George Lyons, Bob Yosco, Frank Mullane.

Frank C. Stanley died of pleurisy in 1910. He was replaced in the group by John H. Meyer, and Henry Burr took over as their lead singer and manager, a position he retained until the group dissolved in 1928. The Peerless Quartet's popularity peaked in the years between 1911 and 1918. Their most successful recordings over the period included "I Want A Girl (Just Like The Girl That Married Dear Old Dad)" and "Let Me Call You Sweetheart" (both for Columbia in 1911); "The Ghost of the Violin" (Columbia, 1913); "Don't Blame It All On Broadway" (Columbia and Victor, 1914); "I Didn't Raise My Boy To Be A Soldier" (Columbia, 1915); "My Bird of Paradise" (Columbia and Victor, 1915); "The Lights of My Home Town" (Victor, 1916); "Over There" (Columbia, 1917); and "I Don't Know Where I'm Going But I'm On My Way" (Columbia and Victor, 1918). They also recorded and released the Irving Berlin-penned tune "At the Devil's Ball" (Columbia) with singer Maurice Burkhart in 1913.

In his book Pop Memories 1890–1954, music archivist and statistician Joel Whitburn assessed a variety of sources such as Talking Machine World's lists of top-selling recordings, and Billboard's sheet music and vaudeville charts, to estimate the most successful recordings of the period. He concluded that the Peerless Quartet had 102 "top ten" hits in all between 1904 and 1926, and in the decade 1910–1919 had more successful recordings than any other musician or group. Although Whitburn's methods of assessment have been criticized, this broadly confirms statements that the group were the most popular of their era.

In addition, Henry Burr, Albert Campbell and Arthur Collins also recorded very successfully as solo singers: Burr and Collins, in particular, were two of the most popular singers of the first two decades of the century. The group also accompanied other singers including Ada Jones, Byron G. Harlan, George O'Connor, and Irving Kaufman. Burr, Campbell and Meyer also recorded together as the Sterling Trio.

=== Later career and dissolution, 1918–1928 ===
In 1918, Collins left the group and was replaced by Frank Croxton. The line-up of Burr, Campbell, Meyer and Croxton remained together until 1925 and continued to record for Columbia and Victor. They had diminishing success, but in 1922 made the first recording of "Way Down Yonder in New Orleans", later a rock and roll hit song.

After that line-up disbanded in 1925, Burr formed a new version of the Peerless Quartet, with himself, Carl Mathieu, Stanley Baughman and James Stanley. The line-up made a film at that time with Pathé Films. The quartet finally disband in 1928, though Burr continued to record thereafter.

== Awards and recognition ==
The Peerless Quartet are acknowledged as one of the major influences on the development of barbershop vocal harmony music. They were inducted into the Vocal Group Hall of Fame in 2003.
