= Grace M. Bolen =

American ragtime composer (1884–1974)

- Born: July 20, 1884; Missouri, United States
- Died: February 16, 1974 (aged 89)
- Genres: Ragtime
- Occupation: Composer
- Known for: "Smoky Topaz"

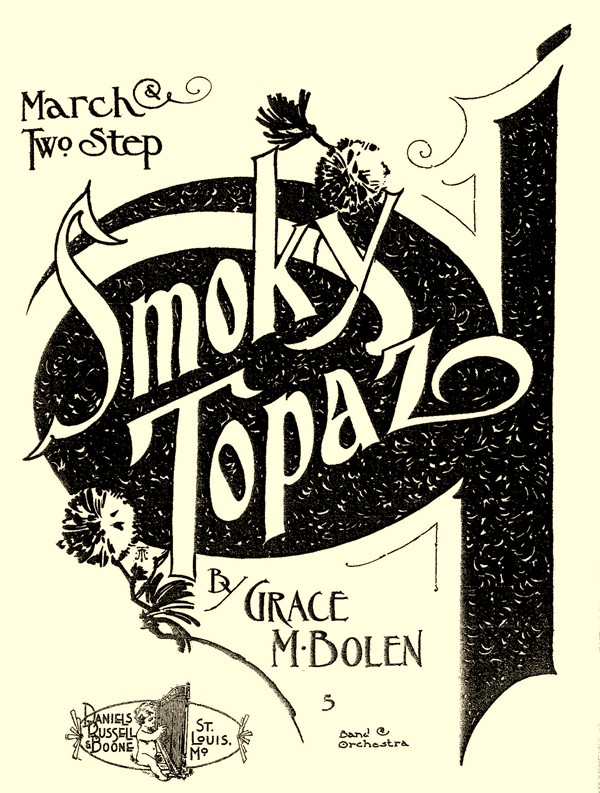
Smoky Topaz by Grace M. Bolen

Grace Marie Bolen (born Missouri; July 20, 1884 – February 16, 1974) was an American composer of ragtime music. Her first composition was submitted when she was 14. "Smoky Topaz", from 1901, is one of her noted works.

Bolen appears to have stopped publishing her music when she married. She married three times between 1903 and 1915, and had one child. She was a widow by 1932, and died of pneumonia at the age of 89. She is buried at Grace Hill Cemetery in Longview, Texas.
