= Frank C. Stanley =

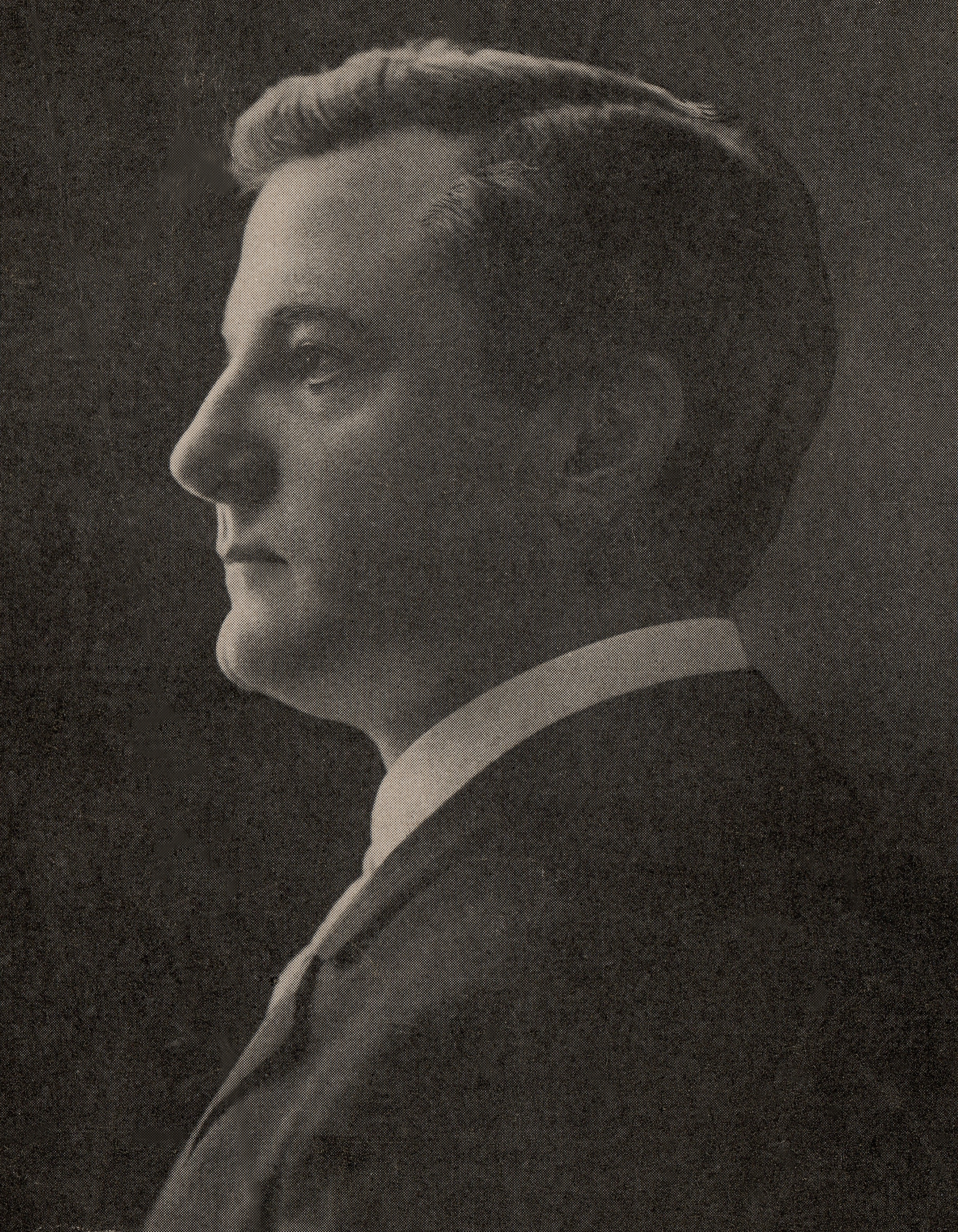

Background information
- Born: William Stanley Grinsted; December 29, 1868; Orange, New Jersey, U.S.
- Died: December 12, 1910 (aged 41) Orange, New Jersey
- Occupation: Singer
- Instrument: Banjo
- Labels: Edison, Victor
- Formerly of: Peerless Quartet
- Auld Lang Syne Frank C. Stanley's 1910 performance of "Auld Lang Syne". Contains the first and last verse.

Frank C. Stanley (born William Stanley Grinsted, December 29, 1868 – December 12, 1910) was a popular American singer, banjoist and recording artist active in the 1890s and the 1900s.

William Stanley Grinsted was born on December 29, 1868 in Orange, New Jersey. He first recorded banjo solos under his own name in October 1891 for Edison then began recording vocal records in 1898 for the National and Norcross Phonograph Companies under the name Frank C. Stanley. He recorded prolifically for Columbia, Victor and Zonophone disc records between 1901 and 1910, alone and as a member of the Columbia and Peerless Quartets. In 1904, The Peerless Quartet consisted of tenors Henry Burr and Albert Campbell, baritone Steve Porter, and bass Tom Daniels. In 1906 Frank C. Stanley replaced Daniels and assumed lead singing and managing responsibilities. He died of pleurisy on December 12, 1910 at his home in Orange. Upon his death, Henry Burr took over the management for the Peerless Quartet.
