= Tiny Tim discography =

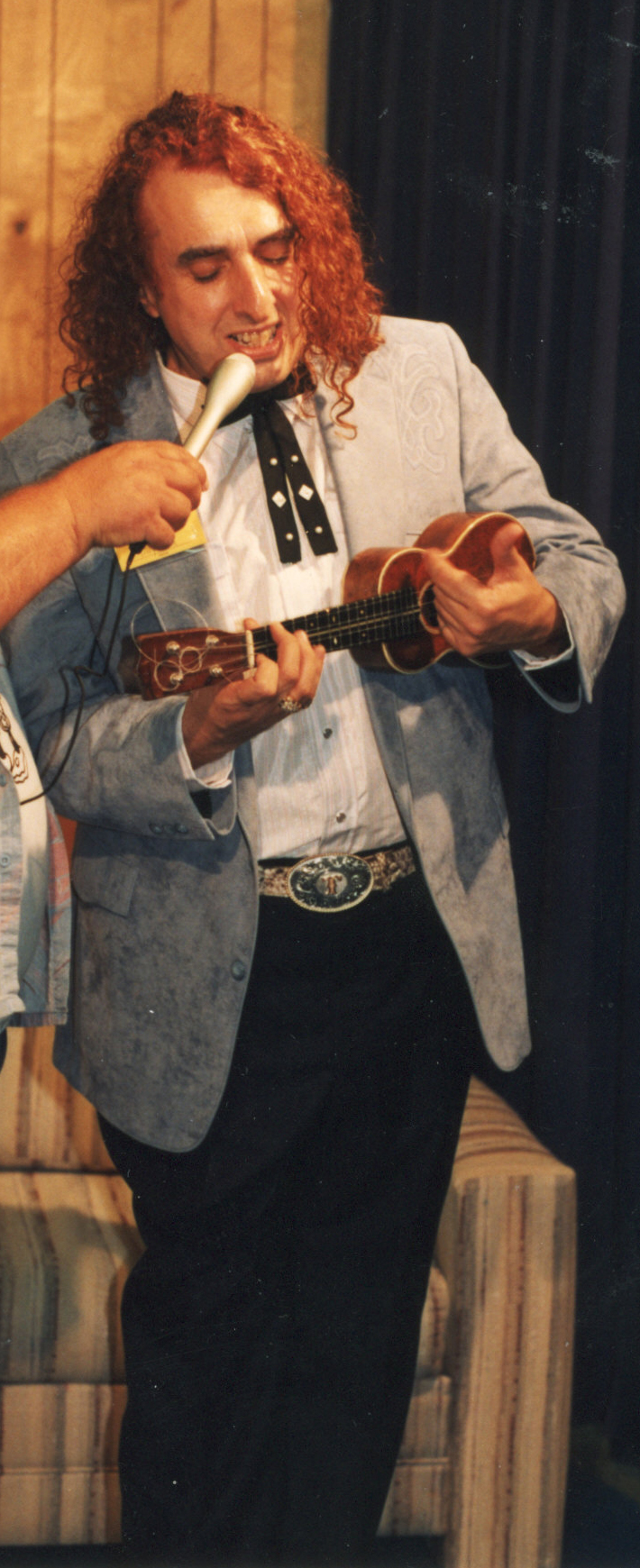
- Tiny Tim circa 1980s
- Studio albums: 12
- EPs: 3
- Live albums: 10
- Compilation albums: 10
- Singles: 42
- Music videos: 3

The discography of Tiny Tim includes 12 studio albums, 10 live albums, 3 EPs and 42 singles.

== Albums ==
=== Studio albums ===
List of studio albums, with selected chart positions
Title	Album details	Peak chart positions
Title	Album details	US
God Bless Tiny Tim	Released: April 1968; Label: Reprise	7
Tiny Tim's 2nd Album	Released: December 1968; Label: Reprise	—
For All My Little Friends	Released: August 1969; Label: Reprise	—
Wonderful World of Romance	Released: 1980; Label: Street of Dreams	—
Chameleon	Released: 1980; Label: Street of Dreams	—
Tiny Tim: The Eternal Troubadour	Released: 1986 (Note: Later reissued as Tiptoe Through the Tulips: Resurrection by Bear Family Records in 1987.); Label: Playback	—
Rock	Released: 1993; Label: Regular	—
Songs of an Impotent Troubadour	Released: 1995; Label: Durtro	—
I Love Me	Released: 1995; Label: Ponk/Seeland	—
Tiny Tim's Christmas Album	Released: 1995; Label: Durtro	—
Girl (with Brave Combo)	Released: 1996; Label: Rounder	—
Prisoner of Love: A Tribute to Russ Columbo	Released: 1996; Label: Vinyl Retentive Productions	—

=== Live albums ===
Title	Album details
World Non-Stop Singing Record, Brighton 1988	Released: 1988
Live in Chicago with the New Duncan Imperials	Released: 1995 (recorded 1993); Label: Pravda/Bughouse
Tiny Tim Unplugged	Released: 1996; Label: Tomanna
The Eternal Troubadour: Live in London	Released: 1997; Label: Durtro
Tiny Tim Live! At the Royal Albert Hall	Released: July 31, 2000 (recorded 1968); Label: Rhino Handmade
The Non-Stop Luna Park Marathon	Released: June 15, 2017; Label: Street of Dreams
A Ghoul at the Pussycat: Live 1963	Released: (recorded 1963); Label: Tiny Tim Pan Alley
After Midnight, 1977 (with Harve Mann)	Released: June 8, 2025 (recorded 1977); Label: Tiny Tim Pan Alley
Live at the Pacific Coliseum	Released: (recorded 1968); Label: Tiny Tim Pan Alley
Beaumont, TX 1984	Released: January 7, 2026 (recorded 1984); Label: Blaha Media

=== Compilation albums ===
Title	Album details
God Bless Tiny Tim: The Complete Reprise Masters ... And More!	Released: April 18, 2006; Label: Rhino
Stardust	Released: March 12, 2007; Label: Zero Communications
I've Never Seen a Straight Banana: Rare Moments Vol. 1	Released: October 20, 2009; Label: Collector's Choice
Tiny Tim: Lost & Found (Rare and Unreleased 1963-1974)	Released: 2011; Label: Secret Seven
The Complete Singles Collection, 1966-1970	Released: April 8, 2016; Label: Cherry Red
Tiny Tim's America	Released: July 22, 2016; Label: Ship to Shore
The Collection	Released: April 19, 2019; Label: Warner Music Group-X5 Music Group
Spirits of the Past: Lost & Found, Volume 4	Released: January 31, 2020; Label: Ship to Shore
Always, Tiny Tim	Released: October 16, 2025; Label: Tiny Tim Pan Alley
Tiny Tim's America: Naked	Released: January 17, 2026; Label: Tiny Tim Pan Alley

== Extended plays ==
Title	Album details
The Voices of Tiny Tim	Released: 1964; Label: Push Pin Graphics/Elektra Films
Keeping My Troubles to Myself	Released: 1983; Label: Street of Dreams
I Believe in Tomorrow	Released: 2010; Label: Ponk

== Singles ==
=== 1960s ===
Year	Title (A-side/B-side)	Peak chart positions				Album
Year	Title (A-side/B-side)	US	CAN	UK	AUS	Album
1966	"April Showers" "Little Girl (In The Pines)"	—	—	—	—	Non-album single
1968	"Tip-Toe Thru The Tulips With Me" "Fill Your Heart"	17	7	—	—	God Bless Tiny Tim
1968	"Bring Back Those Rockabye Baby Days" "This Is All I Ask" (from God Bless Tiny Tim)	95	—	—	—	Non-album single
1968	"Be My Love" "Oh How I Miss You Tonight"	—	—	—	—	With Love and Kisses From Tiny Tim: Concert in Fairyland
1968	"On the Good Ship Lollipop" "Don't Take Your Love From Me"	—	—	—	—	With Love and Kisses From Tiny Tim: Concert in Fairyland
1968	"Hello, Hello" "The Other Side" (from God Bless Tiny Tim)	122	99	—	—	Non-album single
1968	"Great Balls of Fire" "As Time Goes By"	85	78	45	39	Tiny Tim's 2nd Album
1969	"On the Good Ship Lollipop" "America I Love You" (Non-album single)	—	82	—	—	For All My Little Friends
1969	"Neighborhood Children" "Mickey the Monkey" (from For All My Little Friends)	—	—	—	— 79	Tiny Tim's 2nd Album
1969	"I'm a Lonesome Little Raindrop" "What the World Needs Now is Love"	—	—	—	—	For All My Little Friends
1969	"There Will Always Be an England/Bless 'Em All/It's a Long Way to Tipperary" "Have You Seen My Little Sue" (Both sides with Harry Roy & His Band) (UK-exclusive single)	—	—	—	—	Non-album single

=== 1970s ===
Year	Title (A-side/B-side)	Album
1970	"What Kind of American Are You?" "Don't Bite the Hand That Feeds You"	Non-album single
1970	"Why" (with Miss Vicki) "The Spaceship Song"	Non-album single
1971	"'Hendrix Joplin Morrison' Why Did They Have to Die So Young" "Letter Edged in Black"	Non-album single
1971	"(Whispering Voices) The Ballad of Attica Prison" "Prisoner's Song"	Non-album single
1971	"Rudolph The Red-Nosed Reindeer" "White Christmas"	Non-album single
1972	"Maggie May" "When You and I Were Young, Maggie" (Both sides as Grandpa Tim)	Non-album single
1972	"Delilah" "Sunshine" (Both sides as Grandpa Tim)	Non-album single
1972	"Am I Just Another Pretty Face?" "Movies"	Non-album single
1973	"I Ain't Got No Money (No Tengo Dinero)" "Alice Blue Gown"	Non-album single
1973	"Juanita Banana" "My Nose Always Gets In The Way"	Non-album single
1973	"The Happy Wanderer" "Lie Down With The Dogs"	Non-album single
1976	"Howard Cosell (We Think You're Swell)" "The Bi-Centennial Song (I Believe In America)"	Non-album single
1977	"Tip-Toe Disco—Pt. 1" "Tip-Toe Disco—Pt. 2" (by Tampa Studio Band)	Non-album single
1977	"(I'm Gonna Be A) Country Queen" "I Ain't No Cowboy (I Just Found This Hat)" (Non-album single)	Chameleon
1979	"Tip-Toe To The Gas Pumps" "The Hicky (On Your Neck)"	Non-album single

=== 1980s ===
Year	Title (A-side/B-side)	Peak chart positions	Album
Year	Title (A-side/B-side)	US Country	Album
1980	"Wind in the Willows" "The Luna Park Song" (by Alistair Jones)	—	Non-album single
1981	"Comic Strip Man (Biff, Bam, Slam)" "Tell Me That You Love Me (My Sweetheart)"	—	Non-album single
1981	"Comic Strip Man (Biff, Bam, Slam)" "Soul Twister" (12-inch promo-only single)	—	Non-album single
1981	"Tell Me That You Love Me (My Sweetheart)" "Honest, Dear, Honest"	—	Non-album single
1981	"Zoot Zoot Zoot Here Comes Santa In His New Space Suit" "I Like Christmas" (by Bruce Haack & The Robot Man)	—	Zoot Zoot Zoot Here Comes Santa In His New Space Suit
1981	"Yummy, Yummy Pizza" "Oh, Oh, Oh, Those Landlords!"	—	Non-album single
1982	"Do Ya Think I'm Sexy" "Feelings" (Both sides with Gary Lawrence and His Syncopating Syncopators)	—	Non-album single
1984	"Mr. Ed" "Memory"	—	Non-album single
1984	"I'm Just a Lonesome Clone" "I'm The One (That They're Crazy About)"	—	Non-album single
1985	"She Left Me With The Herpes" "Santa Claus Has Got The AIDS This Year"	—	Non-album single
1986	"Let the Little Girl Dance"	—	Non-album single
1988	"Leave Me Satisfied" "I Wanna Get Crazy With You"	70	Non-album single
1988	"I Saw Mr. Presley Tiptoeing Thru the Tulips" (Promo-only single)	—	Non-album single
1989	"Highway to Hell" "The Last Mile Of The Way" (with the Emmanuel Brothers)	—	Rock

=== 1990s-present ===
Year	Title (A-side/B-side)	Album
1990	"Dick Tracy Rides Again" "Ready For Love"	Non-album single
2013	"Nobody Else Can Love Me (Like My Old Tomato Can)"	Non-album single

== Music videos ==
Title	Year
"Juanita Banana"	1973
"The Happy Wanderer"	1973
"Won't You Dance With Me?" (Music video-only release)	1989

== Other appearances ==
Year	Title	Album
1968	"Be My Baby" (with Eleanor Barooshian)	You Are What You Eat
1968	"I Got You Babe" (with Eleanor Barooshian)	You Are What You Eat
1968	"Nowhere Man"	The Beatles 1968 Christmas Record
1981	"Zoot Zoot Zoot Here Comes Santa In His New Space Suit"	Zoot Zoot Zoot Here Comes Santa In His New Space Suit
1991	"Deep Freeze Mama"	The Heart Album
1991	"Tiptoe Dance" (with Tess Winters)	The Heart Album
1991	"You Belong to Me" (with Ella Ray)	The Heart Album
1991	"Only You" (with Tess Winters)	The Heart Album
1991	"Because of You" (with Ella Ray)	The Heart Album
1991	"Someone Greater (Than You and I)" (with Tess Winters)	The Heart Album

== Miscellaneous ==
Title	Album details
With Love and Kisses From Tiny Tim: Concert in Fairyland (Note: Studio album recorded in 1962 and overdubbed with live audience responses.)	Released: 1968; Label: Bouquet
Sweet Sue: Album Sampler (Note: According to Justin Martell, the release is an "abridged version" of a planned, but ultimately unreleased album, containing 3 songs. Copies were given to attendees at Tiny Tim's wedding to Miss Sue in 1995.)	Released: August 18, 1995
