= The Thorn in Mrs. Rose's Side =

Studio album by Biff Rose
- Released: October 15, 1968
- Recorded: 1968 California
- Genre: Folk rock, art rock
- Length: 40:00
- Label: Tetragrammaton Records
- Producer: Art Podell, Nick Woods

Biff Rose chronology
The Thorn in Mrs. Rose's Side (1968)	Children of Light (1969)

Professional ratings
Review scores
Source	Rating
AllMusic	4.5/5 stars

The Thorn in Mrs. Rose's Side is the debut album by Biff Rose.

== Overview ==
It was released in 1968 on Bill Cosby's music label Tetragrammaton Records. "Fill Your Heart" was written together with American composer, singer-songwriter, and actor Paul Williams. Tiny Tim released "Fill Your Heart" on his album, God Bless Tiny Tim, six months before Biff Rose's own version.

David Bowie began performing “Fill Your Heart” in his live sets in early 1970 and later recorded the song for his 1971 album, Hunky Dory.

The album peaked at No. 75 on the Billboard Top LPs, and it stayed on the chart for 14 weeks. It was ranked lower on the Cashbox Top 100 Albums chart, peaking at No. 89 and staying on it for a total of 6 weeks.

== Track listing ==
All songs written by Biff Rose, except where noted.

1. "Mama's Boy" – 02:55
2. "Angel Tension" - 03:12
3. "Fill Your Heart" (Biff Rose, Paul Williams) - 03:12
4. "Paradise Almost Lost" (music: Biff Rose; lyrics: Joseph Simon Newman) - 05:20
5. "Molly" - 04:12
6. "The Stars" – 01:53
7. "It's Happening" – 01:48
8. "What's Gnawing at Me" – 03:14
9. "Buzz the Fuzz" – 02:52
10. "Gentle People" – 02:32
11. "The Man " – 03:38

== Personnel ==
- Biff Rose - piano, vocals
- Arthur G. Wright - arrangements on tracks 1–3, 7–9
- Biff Rose - arrangement on track 4
- Kirby Johnson - arrangement on tracks 5, 6, 11
- Nick Woods - arrangement on track 10

== Production ==
- Producers: Art Podell, Nick Woods
- Engineers: Brian Ingoldsby

== Charts ==
Chart (1969)	Peak position
US Billboard Top LPs	75
US Cashbox Top 100 Albums	89
