= Fill Your Heart =

Fill Your Heart may refer to:

- Fill Your Heart With Biff Rose, album by Biff Rose
- "Fill Your Heart", song by Biff Rose and Paul Williams, covered by Tiny Tim, David Bowie on Hunky Dory and by Claudio Casanova & His Orchestra
