= Stay Down =

Stay Down may refer to:

== Trade unionism ==
- "Stay down strike", a 1935 coal miners' strike in Cwmfelinfach
- Stay Down, Miner (1937), a play by Montagu Slater

== Albums ==
- Stay Down (album), by the Smoking Popes (2008)

== Songs ==
- "Stay Down" (Lil Durk, 6lack and Young Thug song), (2020)
- "Stay Down" (Mary J. Blige song), (2007)
- "Stay Down" by Royal Hunt, on the album Moving Target (1995)
- "Stay Down" by Krayzie Bone featuring Akon, on the album The Fixtape Vol. 1: Smoke on This (2008)
- "Stay Down" by Moby, on the album Wait for Me (2009)
- "Stay Down" by El-P, on the album Cancer 4 Cure (2012)
- "Stay Down" by Big Sean, on the album Dark Sky Paradise (2015)
- "Stay Down Here Where You Belong" by Irving Berlin (1914)
