= Joseph Simon Newman =

American poet

Joseph S. Newman

Joseph Simon Newman (December 6, 1891 – November 10, 1960) was an American entrepreneur and writer. He was a founder of the Newman-Stern Company, and gained renown as a writer of both light and serious verse.

== Biography ==
Joseph Newman was born in New London, Ohio, the son of Simon and Hanna Cohn Newman, who then moved to Cleveland. A graduate of Central High School, Newman attended the Case Institute of Technology before withdrawing to go into business. He married Babette Weidenthal, daughter of Cleveland journalist Maurice Weidenthal, in 1913. Two years later, with brother Arthur Samuel Newman and partner Arnold Stern, he founded the Electro-Set Co. to manufacture educational toys, some being his own inventions. The firm soon added sporting goods to its line and became the Newman-Stern Company. Newman meanwhile began writing columns on electricity for The Plain Dealer and contributing humorous rhymes to Ted Robinson's "Philosopher of Folly" column under the pseudonym, "Prof. Cy N. Tific." He was a member of the City Club of Cleveland, and from 1925–58 collaborated with Carl D. Friebolin in writing lyrics (775 in all) for the club's annual Anvil Revue. His first volume of verse, Poems For Penguins, was published in 1941; it was followed by It Could Be Verse! (1948), Perishable Poems (1952), and Verse Yet! (1959). After his retirement from business, in 1952 he began to write a weekly column for the Cleveland Press under the heading "It Could Be Verse". In 1957, he began to contribute a daily column under the title "Joe Newman's Frying Pan". Among many other activities, Newman taught at Cleveland College and served as trustee of The Cleveland Play House. Newman died at the age of 68 in Cleveland, Ohio.

His poem "Black Cross" has been recorded by Lord Buckley on Way Out Humor,1959, and by Bob Dylan on The Minnesota Hotel Tape, 1961. His poem "Paradise Almost Lost" was recorded by Biff Rose on The Thorn in Mrs. Rose's Side.

The foreword of It Could Be Verse was written by Louis Untermeyer.

He is the uncle of actor Paul Newman.

== Bibliography ==
- Poems For Penguins and Other Lyrical Lapses. New York: Greenberg, 1941
- It Could Be Verse! Cleveland and New York: The World Publishing Company, 1948
- Perishable Poems. Cleveland and New York: The World Publishing Company, 1952
- Verse Yet! Cleveland and New York: The World Publishing Company, 1959
- One Summer Day Cleveland and New York: The World Publishing Company, 1962 (posthumously)
