= For All My Little Friends =

Studio album by Tiny Tim
- Released: August 1969
- Recorded: 1968–1969
- Genres: Novelty, children's
- Length: 30:00
- Label: Reprise
- Producer: Gene Shiveley

Tiny Tim chronology
Tiny Tim's 2nd Album (1968)	For All My Little Friends (1969)	Wonderful World of Romance (1980)

Professional ratings
Review scores
Source	Rating
AllMusic	link

For All My Little Friends is the third album by Tiny Tim. It was released in August 1969 by Reprise Records.

== Background ==
Intended for children, For All My Little Friends was Tiny Tim's final album for Reprise, although he remained with the label until early 1971. The album was produced by Richard Perry's engineer, Gene Shively, although Perry himself produced the tracks "On The Good Ship Lollipop", "Mickey The Monkey", "I'm A Lonesome Little Raindrop", and "What The World Needs Now Is Love". "The Viper" was originally released on Tiny Tim's first album, God Bless Tiny Tim. Justin Martell notes that "snippets of Tiny's narration" featured on the album were reused from Tiny Tim's 2nd Album.

The album was nominated for Best Recording for Children at the 1970 Grammy Awards, becoming Tiny Tim's only award nomination.

== Track listing ==
1. "On The Good Ship Lollipop" – 1:59
2. "Sunshine Cake" – 2:12
3. "Mickey The Monkey" – 2:02
4. "Hot And Cold Water" – 0:40
5. "Two Times A Day" – 1:30
6. "Chickery Chick" – 1:44
7. "Oliphant The Elephant" – 0:55
8. "I'm A Lonesome Little Raindrop" – 2:47
9. "They Always Pick On Me" – 2:12
10. "Aren't You Glad You're You" – 1:55
11. "Sadie The Seal" – 1:42
12. "The Viper" – 2:06
13. "Bill The Buffalo" – 1:58
14. "Remember Your Name And Address" – 2:15
15. "What The World Needs Now Is Love" – 3:15
