= Tiny Tim Live! At the Royal Albert Hall =

Live album by Tiny Tim
- Released: September 27, 2000
- Recorded: October 30, 1968
- Venue: Royal Albert Hall
- Genre: Comedy, pop
- Length: 1:12:57
- Label: Rhino

Tiny Tim Live! At the Royal Albert Hall is a live album by American singer Tiny Tim, recorded at The Royal Albert Hall in 1968, but not commercially released until 2000 by Rhino Records. Live! At the Royal Albert Hall is the only album by Tiny Tim to have an accompaniment of full-sized orchestra, from first overture to final applause.

The album was recorded live to a 4-track master in 1968, and these original, 4-track master tapes were utilized to create this release. Due to the nature of being recorded live, a few recording mistakes are audible, such as Tiny Tim's vocal mic volume being set at an unsuitable level before being fixed by a recording engineer.

The album was originally issued as a CD through "Rhino Handmade", limited to 3,500 copies. Included in this release was a reproduction of the original 28-page concert program given to the audience members that night. In April 2019, the album was reissued by Run Out Groove as a limited edition red vinyl double LP.

== Track listing ==
1. "God Bless Tiny Tim Overture"
2. "Welcome to My Dreams"
3. "Livin' in the Sunlight, Lovin' in the Moonlight"
4. "On the Old Front Porch"
5. "I Gave Her That"
6. "Save Your Sorrow"
7. "Love Is No Excuse"
8. "As Time Goes By"
9. "A Little Smile Will Go a Long, Long Way"
10. "I Got You, Babe"
11. "Then I'd Be Satisfied With Life"
12. "Where Does Daddy Go When He Goes Out?" / "Hello Hello"
13. "You Called It Madness (But I Called It Love)"
14. "The Other Side"
15. "I Love Me (I'm Wild About Myself)"
16. "I Wonder How I Look While I'm Asleep"
17. "Frisco Flo"
18. "Medley: I'm Glad I'm a Boy" / "My Hero"
19. "I Hold Your Hand in Mine"
20. "Earth Angel"
21. Mr. Tim Recalls His Visit With Mr. Dylan: "The Maine Stein Song" / "I'm Just a Vagabond Lover" / "Like a Rolling Stone" / "My Time Is Your Time"
22. "Mr. Tim Recalls His Visit With the Rolling Stones: "(I Can't Get No) Satisfaction"
23. "Nowhere Man"
24. "Tiptoe Through the Tulips"
25. "I'll See You Again"
