= Hotel Fort Des Moines =

- U.S. National Register of Historic Places
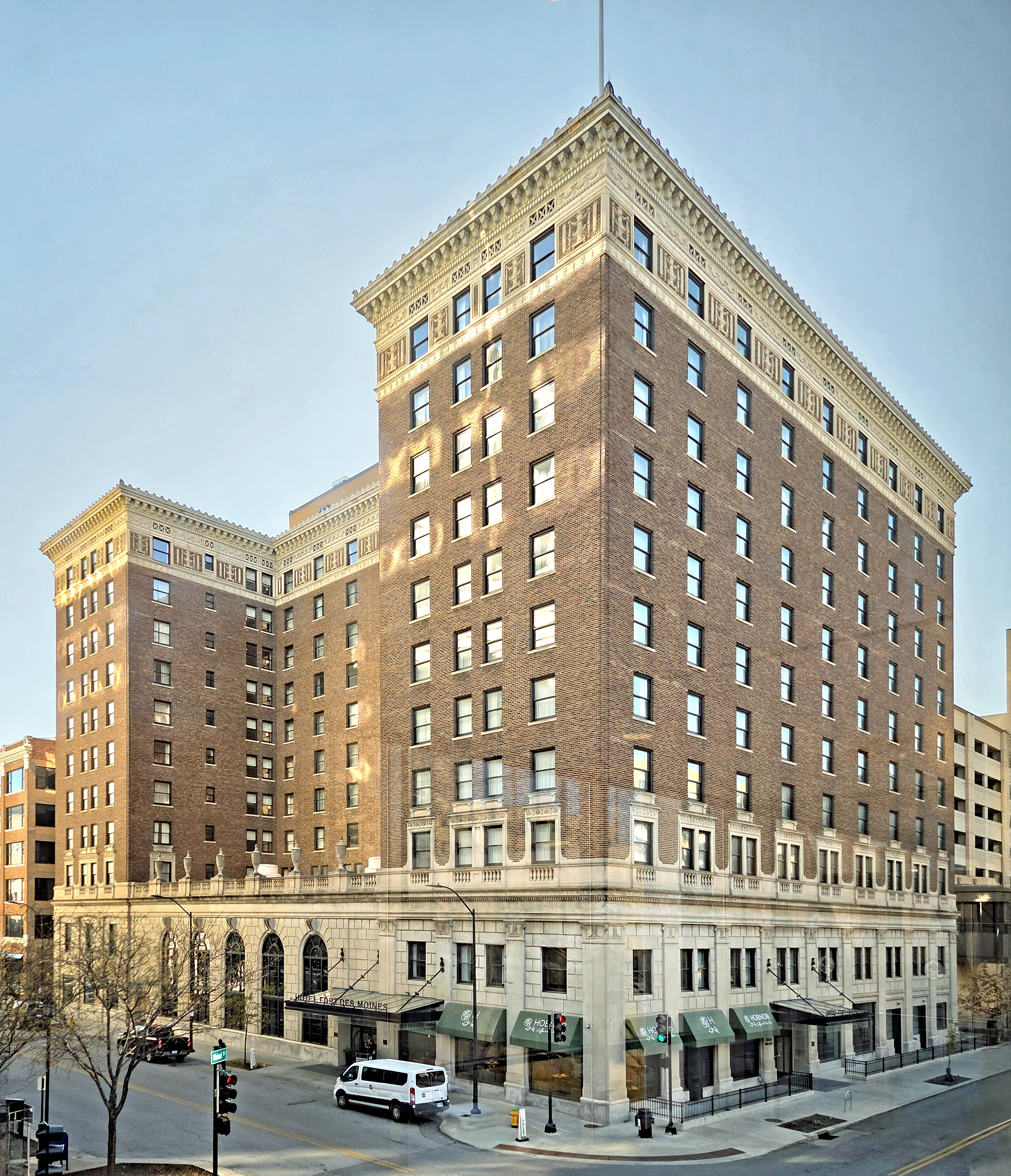
- The Hotel Fort Des Moines viewed from the northeast

- Location within Iowa Location within the United States
- Location: 1000 Walnut Street, Des Moines, Iowa
- Coordinates: 41°35′4.1″N 93°37′47.1″W
- Area: less than one acre
- Built: 1918–1919
- Architect: Proudfoot, Bird & Rawson
- NRHP reference No.: 82002636
- Added to NRHP: September 16, 1982

The Hotel Fort Des Moines is a historic building in downtown Des Moines, Iowa, United States. It was listed on the National Register of Historic Places in 1982.

== History ==
The three original promoters of the hotel were Des Moines businessmen Richard R. Rollins, Frederick C. Hubbell, Clyde Herring, and Norman M. Wilchinski. The prominent Des Moines architectural firm of Proudfoot, Bird & Rawson designed the building, which opened in 1919. Twelve United States presidents, including Woodrow Wilson, Harry S. Truman, John F. Kennedy, Richard Nixon and George H. W. Bush were guests in the hotel. Other notable guests have included actress Mae West, aviator Charles Lindbergh and Soviet premier Nikita Khrushchev. Singer Tiny Tim lived at the hotel for several years in the early 1990s. The hotel closed to guests on November 13, 2015 for ongoing renovations, following the sale of the property from Jeff Hunter to Hawkeye Hotels, and reopened as a Curio Collection Hilton Worldwide hotel.

== Architecture ==
The hotel is an eleven-story building that rises 140 feet (43 m) above the ground. There are two floors below ground and the building contains three elevators. The hotel rooms are in a nine-story H-shaped tower that allows for increased light and air circulation for more rooms. It sits on a two-story base that houses the public rooms and commercial space. The exterior of the building can be divided into three sections visually using the principle of the classical column: a solid base, a basically unadorned shaft, and a decorative capital. The ornamentation is concentrated on the lower floors and near the top just below the cornice line.
