= Johan von Sydow =

Swedish director and writer (born 1961)

- Born: 1961; Boden

Johan von Sydow (born 1961) is a Swedish director and writer. He is known for his 2011 documentary Sagan om Jussi (Saga of Jussi) and internationally as the director of the 2020 documentary film Tiny Tim: King for a Day.

== Career ==
Johan von Sydow was born in 1961 and grew up in Boden, Sweden. He started working for Sveriges Television in 1993. Between the 2000s and 2010s, he directed several documentaries like Mare Kandre - Det är jag som är ett geni and Sagan om Jussi, the latter which received critical acclaim for focusing on the distinct character of the opera singer Jussi Björling. In 2020, he directed a documentary on American musician Tiny Tim titled Tiny Tim: King for a Day which examines the fame and personal life of the musician, with "Weird Al" Yankovic narrating the documentary. The documentary premiered in August 2020 in Canada, and in New York and selected theatres in the United States on 23 April 2021.

== Partial filmography ==
Film
Year	Title	Director	Writer	Producer	Notes	Ref.
2009	Mare Kandre - Det är jag som är ett geni	Yes	Yes	No	English translation: "Mare Kandre: I Am a Genius"; TV movie; Documentary	
2011	Sagan om Jussi	Yes	Yes	No	TV movie; Documentary	
2013	The Artist Who Disappeared	Yes	Yes	No	TV movie; Documentary	
2013	Ratata Through the 80s	Yes	Yes	No	TV movie; Documentary	
2020	Tiny Tim: King for a Day	Yes	No	No	Documentary	
2020	Det finns så många vägar - en film om John Holm	Yes	Yes	No	TV movie; Documentary	
