= Tiny Tim: King for a Day =

2020 biographical film about Tiny Tim

- Directed by: Johan von Sydow
- Screenplay by: Martin Daniel
- Produced by: David Herdies
- Starring: Tiny Tim "Weird Al" Yankovic; Jonas Mekas; Richard Barone
- Cinematography: Damir Kudin
- Edited by: Stefan Sundlöf
- Music by: Tiny Tim
- Production company: Momento Film
- Release date: 23 August 2020
- Running time: 78 minutes
- Country: Sweden
- Language: English

Tiny Tim: King for a Day is a 2020 Swedish biographical film about musician Tiny Tim. The film was directed by Johan von Sydow and features "Weird Al" Yankovic in a narrator role.

The file was released on 23 August 2020 at the Fantasia International Film Festival.

== Plot ==
The story details the life of Herbert Khaury, and his rise to stardom and eventual fall. Throughout the film, "Weird Al" Yankovic reads excerpts from Khaury's diary.

== Cast ==
- Herbert Khaury/Tiny Tim (archive footage)
- "Weird Al" Yankovic (narrator)
- Jonas Mekas
- Richard Barone
- Susan M. Khaury Wellman
- Johnny Pineapple
- Justin A. Martell

Also featured in archive footage is Johnny Carson, Dick Cavett, Bing Crosby, Jackie Gleason, Bob Dylan, Ed Sullivan and Donald Trump.
