= The David Letterman Show =

American morning talk show

- Developed by: Fred Silverman
- Written by: Merrill Markoe (head writer)
- Directed by: Hal Gurnee (July—October)
- Presented by: David Letterman
- Announcer: Bob Sarlatte; Bill Wendell
- Music by: Frank Owens (bandleader)
- Country of origin: United States
- Original language: English
- No. of episodes: 90

Production
- Executive producers: David Letterman; Jack Rollins
- Producers: Barry Sand (July—October)
- Production locations: Studio 6-A, NBC Studios; New York, New York
- Running time: 90 minutes (June 23 – August 1); 60 minutes (August 4 – October 24)
- Production companies: Space Age Meats in association with NBC

Original release
- Network: NBC
- Release: June 23 – October 24, 1980

Related
- Late Night with David Letterman; Late Show with David Letterman

The David Letterman Show is an American morning talk show that was hosted by David Letterman on NBC. It originally aired from June 23 to October 24, 1980. Originally, the series lasted 90 minutes, then 60 minutes from August 4 onward.

== Background ==
=== Letterman's 1976–1980 NBC appearances ===
David Letterman's relationship with NBC began in January 1976, initially via an appearance at a TV run-through in Burbank's NBC Studios for a Ron Greenberg-produced, Jim Lange-hosted game show called Word Grabbers whose eventual pilot would not be picked up. A struggling young nightclub comic based in Los Angeles and performing mostly in The Comedy Store, Letterman was rounded up for the run-through as part of a group of Comedy Store comics that also included George Miller, Tom Dreesen, Johnny Dark, Roberta Ferrill, Heather Harwood, and Alliene Flanery.

Among his numerous 1977–1978 game and variety show spots, Letterman appeared, alongside Arte Johnson and Jaye P. Morgan, as a celebrity judge panelist in an episode of NBC's daytime amateur talent program The Gong Show in July 1977.

Then came the lead role as a mock newscaster on the Peeping Times sketch comedy program, a spoof of the American national television news magazines like 60 Minutes and Weekend. NBC broadcast the comedy show at 8:00 p.m. on a Wednesday night in late January 1978 as an hour-long primetime special/pilot potentially to be turned into a regular series, however, due to tepid viewership, it never went beyond the initial airing.

Letterman debuted on the highly-rated The Tonight Show Starring Johnny Carson later that year in November, performing a 7-minute stand-up comedy set at the end of which the powerful host Carson waved the young performer over for a follow-up interview, an indication he was pleased with a comic's material. Over the next two years Letterman returned to the show several times, and occasionally served as guest host in Carson's absence. During early 1980, Letterman took a job emceeing an Anti-Defamation League event presenting the advocacy organization's award to NBC's president Fred Silverman who was so impressed by Letterman's performance at the said event that he decided to offer the 33-year-old comedy performer and writer a morning talk show on the network. Silverman envisioned the new show to be framed along the lines of the 1950s CBS show Arthur Godfrey and His Friends.

In early 1980, NBC's daytime morning lineup consisted of six game shows. The David Letterman Show was made possible by the cancellation of three of them: High Rollers, Chain Reaction, and the long-running daytime version of Hollywood Squares.

The series was a critical success (and won several Daytime Emmys including the 1981 Daytime Emmy Award for Outstanding Special Class Writing) but the edgy comedy did not capture morning television watchers, who were more accustomed at the time to talk shows, soap operas, game shows, and prime time reruns.

== Production ==
The original producer was Bob Stewart, a veteran quiz-show creator who had enlisted Letterman as a panelist on Pyramid from 1978 onward. However, due to creative differences, Stewart left the show four days before its premiere, and production of the first several shows fell to head writer Merrill Markoe, who acted as the show's de facto producer despite having absolutely no prior experience in the role. Much more comfortable as a writer than as producer, Markoe stayed aboard as the show's head writer for the entire run of the series but was succeeded as producer by Barry Sand. Sand joined the show on July 7th and remained at the helm for the rest of its run; Sand would later return to working with Letterman as producer for the first five years of Late Night. Michael McDonald of the Doobie Brothers wrote the opening theme of the show.

After the first month, Hal Gurnee began directing the show; he'd remain Letterman's director through the mid-1990's. Biff Henderson was the stage manager, a role he served for the next 35 years of Letterman's career. The writing staff initially consisted of Merrill Markoe (head writer), Valri Bromfield, Rich Hall, Harold Kimmel, Edie McClurg, Gerard Mulligan, Paul Raley, Wil Shriner, Bob Sarlatte and Ed Subitsky. (Bromfield, McClurg, Kimmel, and Sarlatte left before the show's end; added to the staff through the run were Ron Richards, Gary Jacobs and Letterman himself, not credited as a writer on early episodes.)

All the writers appeared on camera, some fairly frequently. Seen most often, usually in character (when not on as themselves) being interviewed by Letterman, were:

- Edie McClurg as regular correspondent Mrs. Marv Mendenhall, a housewife who shared various tips, advice and opinions with Letterman and the audience. McClurg was also seen in the recurring roles of Dot Duncan; one of the Timkie sisters; and a 105-year-old version of herself.
- Valri Bromfield as confused teen Debbie Smith; intense, no-nonsense Mrs. Bjorkman; one of The Timkie Sisters; singer Lila DeGay, and other characters.
- Paul Raley as paranoid ex-FBI agent P.J. Rails, and other characters.
- Rich Hall, as himself, using plastic toys to present recreations of news events in the (fictional) town of Pitkinville, Montana.
- Will Shriner, also as himself, usually presenting a short film.
- Ed Subitzky as an unnamed character who would be announced as a well-known celebrity (e.g., Gary Coleman, Suzanne Somers, Donna Summer), but—after appearing on stage—would then almost immediately embarrassedly confess to NOT being that celebrity, but just a guy who wanted to get on TV. (This bit was reprised on early episodes of Late Night with David Letterman.)
- Bob Sarlatte was the announcer for the first six weeks, and also occasionally interacted with Letterman in conversations and desk bits.

Familiar bits that became staples of Letterman's comedy on his later shows were originally introduced on this show. They include: "Small Town News", "Stupid Pet Tricks", and an ever-changing non-sequitur opening introduction immediately before Letterman is seen on camera. Because Letterman owned the rights to The David Letterman Show, he was able to claim ownership of all the sketches that originally aired on it; this would prove valuable in 1993, when Letterman left NBC to launch The Late Show on CBS. NBC wanted to claim that much of the work he did on Late Night was the property of NBC, but because those sketches were carryovers from The David Letterman Show, he was allowed to take them to CBS.

The production staff consisted of George Callahan, Kim Carney, Lee B. Chernick, Barbara Gaines, Edd Hall, Tim Holton, Brian J. McAloon, Meg Mortimer, Dency Nelson, and David Reale. Edd Hall (later the announcer on The Tonight Show with Jay Leno) and Late Show producer Barbara Gaines were both production assistants. Bob Sarlatte was succeeded partway through the run by Bill Wendell, who also announced on Letterman's next two shows until leaving the show in 1995.

The news producer was Alan Mohan, and the news writer was Nick Allen. Bill Kelley was the technical director. The musical director was Frank Owens who led the "David Letterman Symphony Orchestra" (actually a four-person combo) and interacted with Letterman. Longtime NBC newsman Edwin Newman provided live news updates in the studio during each broadcast in the 90-minute version of the series; studio audience members often interrupted his reporting with applause, laughter or groans, as if Newman were an anchor on Saturday Night Live's "Weekend Update".

The program was produced by Space Age Meats, a precursor to Letterman's later production company, Worldwide Pants Incorporated.

== Guests ==
Among guests who appeared were Steve Allen, Andy Kaufman, Tom Snyder, photojournalists Jon & Keiko Alpert, keyboardist Suzanne Ciani, Steve Martin, Robert Klein, Bill Murray, Dr. Isaac Asimov, Allen Ludden, and Jeff Greenfield, who reviewed the first show while it was on the air.

The show's musical guests included Loudon Wainwright III, The Drifters, Janis Ian, Irene Cara, Maria Muldaur, Nell Carter, Judy Collins, John Sebastian, Tom Rush, Lionel Hampton, Charles Aznavour, Tracy Nelson, Linda Hopkins, Esther Satterfield, Lacy J. Dalton, Michael Franks, Rusty Draper, Mickey Gilley, Gerard Kenny, John Hartford, Johnny Paycheck, Al DiMeola, Sippie Wallace, and Harve Mann.

In one of his earliest television appearances, a young Bill Maher was an audience member on the show's first episode, and Conan O'Brien claims he hitchhiked to New York just to see a broadcast in Studio 6A (which has also been home to some of Jack Paar's NBC programs, and then eventually Letterman and O'Brien's versions of the network's Late Night franchise).

== Show timeline and highlights ==
- June 23: First show. In addition to Letterman, regulars introduced on the show include announcer Bob Sarlette, writer/performers Edie McClurg and Valri Bromfield, newsreader Edwin Newman, and bandleader Frank Owens. (Writer/performers Rich Hall, Paul Raley, Will Shriner and Gerard Mulligan will debut later in the week.) Head writer Merrill Markoe produces the show, without credit—the show has no official producer. Bruce Burmester directs.
- June 27: The very first edition of Stupid Pet Tricks is presented.
- July 7: Barry Sand succeeds Markoe as producer. Markoe remains head writer.
- July 9: This episode marked the debut of "Small Town News", which became another recurring segment on Letterman's shows throughout his TV career.
- July 11: The first "Viewer Mail" segment is performed.
- July 28: Hal Gurnee succeeds Burmester as director.
- August 4: The show is reduced from 90 minutes to 60 minutes as of this episode. Sarlette is no longer with the show.
- August 11: Bill Wendell succeeds Bob Sarlatte as the show's permanent announcer. Wendell remained with Letterman for the next 15 years.
- August 21: Valri Bromfield's last on-air appearance on the show. (She is still credited as a writer for the next two weeks.)
- September 10: Initial announcement of the "have The David Letterman Show in your own home" contest.
- September 19: Edie McClurg's last on-air appearance on the show. This is also her last show as a writer.
- September 26: The David Letterman Show ran for four more weeks after its cancellation was announced.
- October 10: The entire episode is devoted to a Missouri farmer named Floyd Stiles, who along with his wife, Zola Mae Stiles, is flown in from Collins, Missouri specifically for the show's "Floyd Stiles Day" broadcast.
- October 22: Winners of the "have The David Letterman Show in your own home" contest are featured in a special episode taped in Cresco, Iowa.
- October 24: The final show. Crew members' resumes are shown as bumpers leading into and out of commercials during the final week's in-studio episodes.

The final weeks of the show received particular acclaim. Esquire noted, "He cut loose with his own jokes until they had a 2:00 a.m. comedy-club edge. He reached for his emergency weapons. Let go, he let go. By the beginning of October, audiences were packing themselves into the studio." College boys hitched cross-country with petitions to save him. Some Long Island housewives threatened to block Manhattan traffic until the network relented.

== Aftermath ==
For the next year after the show's cancellation, NBC paid Letterman $1,000,000 ($20,000 a week) to do nothing except not work for someone else without their permission, which included guest-hosting The Tonight Show Starring Johnny Carson on multiple occasions. Letterman's next program, Late Night premiered on February 1, 1982, replacing Tom Snyder's Tomorrow program.

== Episode status ==
Approximately 83 of the 90 episodes produced are held in the archives of Letterman's production company, Worldwide Pants; a brief clip from the finale was shown on Letterman's 15th anniversary show in 1997, and similarly brief clips from several episodes were featured as interstitials on the Late Show's final episode in 2015. Some episodes are available for on-site viewing at the Paley Center for Media in New York. In 2022, Letterman started releasing interviews from this program (in addition to his later shows) on his official YouTube channel, after longtime Letterman-archivist Don Giller did this on his own fan channel.
