= This Is All I Ask =

Song by Nat King Cole

from the album The Very Thought Of You
- Released: November 1, 1958
- Genre: pop
- Length: 4:29
- Label: Capitol
- Songwriter: Gordon Jenkins

"This Is All I Ask" is a popular song written by Gordon Jenkins in 1958.

Jenkins considered this his finest composition, and he recorded it in arrangements he wrote for Nat King Cole, Harry Nilsson, Tiny Tim, Tony Bennett, and Frank Sinatra. Bennett continued to sing the song throughout his career and gave an "emotional" performance of it at his final concerts, in 2021, at Radio City Music Hall where he celebrated his 95th birthday with Lady Gaga.

== Recordings ==
- 1958 Nat King Cole included the song on his album The Very Thought of You.
- 1960 Tony Bennett - included in his album Alone Together
- 1962 Jenkins released his own instrumental version of the song as a single (Columbia 42608). It registered in the Cashbox "Looking Ahead" survey, a chart measuring singles popularity below position 100, early in 1963.
- 1962 Burl Ives - his single release reached No. 67 in the Billboard Hot 100 and was also included in his album Singin' Easy (Decca DL 4433/74433).
- 1963 Tony Bennett - a single release, which reached the No. 70 position in the Billboard Hot 100.
- 1963 Perry Como sang the song four times on his NBC Kraft Music Hall television show in 1963 prior to its release on his The Songs I Love LP that year.
- 1963 Robert Goulet sang the song on a 1963 episode of The Jack Benny Program as did Gisele MacKenzie one year later on Benny's 1964 Christmas Day show. The Goulet version can be seen in syndication reruns. The MacKenzie appearance is available on a 2013 home video release. Goulet included the song on his 1964 album My Love Forgive Me.
- 1963 John Gary - for his album Catch a Rising Star.
- 1964 Andy Williams released a version on his 1964 album, The Wonderful World of Andy Williams.
- 1964 Jimmy Durante - included in his album Hello Young Lovers.
- 1964 Bobby Timmons - recorded for his album Workin' Out! with Johnny Lytle.
- 1965 The song was featured on Frank Sinatra's 1965 album September of My Years, arranged by Jenkins, which won the Grammy Award for Album of the Year at the 8th Annual Grammy Awards. Sinatra was inspired to record September of My Years, an album of songs on aging, by hearing the line "Beautiful girls, walk a little slower when you walk by me" from the song.
- 1965 Johnny Mathis - recorded for his album Love Is Everything.
- 1965 barbershop quartet champions The Four Renegades sang the song on The Top Ten Barbershop Quartets Of 1965, arranged by their tenor Warren "Buzz" Haeger.
- 1966 Jack Jones - for his album The Impossible Dream.
- 1968 Matt Monro - included in the album The Late, Late Show.
- 1968 Tiny Tim - for his album God Bless Tiny Tim.
- 1973 Harry Nilsson - recorded for his album A Little Touch of Schmilsson in the Night
- 1984 Howard Keel - for his album And I Love You So.
- 1989 George Benson included in the album Tenderly.
- 2011 Tony Bennett & Josh Groban - included in the album Duets II.
- 2021 Ray Stevens - included in his digital album Slow Dance.
