= I'm a Lonesome Little Raindrop (Looking for a Place to Fall) =

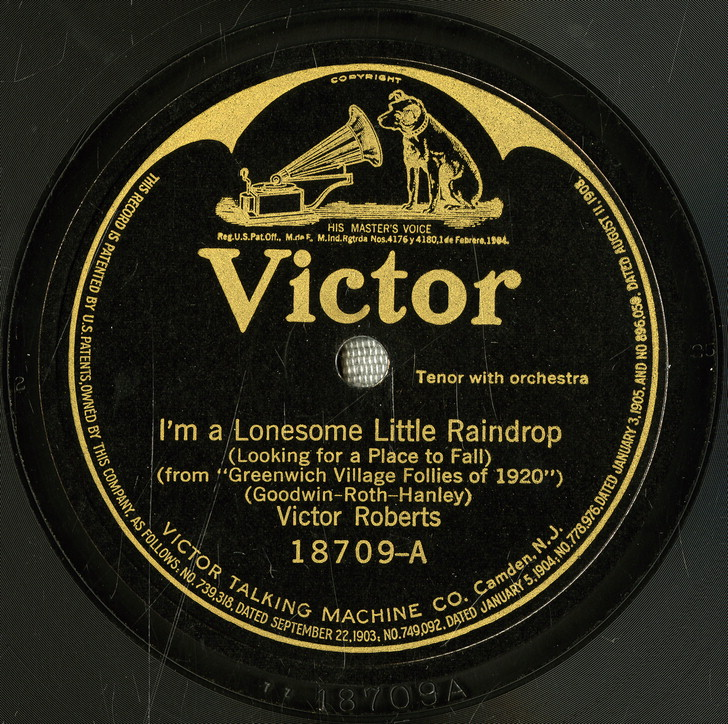
From the Library of Congress National Jukebox (1920 audio recording)

"I'm a Lonesome Little Raindrop (Looking for a Place to Fall)" is a song composed by American songwriter James F. Hanley and lyricists Joe Goodwin and Murray Roth. The tune was originally written for the 1920 musical The Greenwich Village Follies.

The song was recorded in Camden, New Jersey, in November 1920, sung by vocalist Billy Jones (AKA "Victor Roberts"). It was later recorded by Tiny Tim and released on his 1969 children's album For All My Little Friends.

== Lyrics ==
I wonder why I'm always lonesome
and what the trouble can be.

Some fellows claim their mate
but it just seems like fate
has made a monkey out of me.

I'm like a raindrop in a cloud,
I find I'm lost whenever I am in a crowd, believe me,

I'm a lonesome little raindrop
looking for a place to fall.

The clouds are dark but that don't matter,
'cause into some fair garden,
I'll go pitter, patter, pitter, patter.

I hope goodness knows,
the friendly breeze that blows,
will let me tumble down into the heart of a rose.

I'm a lonesome little raindrop
looking for a place to fall.

You've heard of Robinson Crusoe,
well he had nothing on me.

I'm always all alone,
a sweetie of my own,
would make me happy as can be.

I'm just as blue as skies above,
I'd like to find someone
to shower with my love, believe me.

I'm a lonesome little raindrop
looking for a place to fall.

The girls say I'm a charming fella,
but when I come around each girl puts up her umbrella.

Girls that are so fair,
they all give me the air
I keep on falling, falling
but don't land anywhere, oh

I'm a lonesome little raindrop
looking for a place to fall.
