= Harve Mann =

American entertainer and songwriter

Harvey Leonard Sussmann (known professionally as Harve Mann) is an American entertainer and songwriter.

Mann is best known as “The Lounge Singer" character” on The David Letterman Show and as the opening act and musical director for Tiny Tim.

== Background ==
Born in Philadelphia, Pennsylvania on April 25, 1948, his mother, Paula Mann was well-known locally as a pianist and entertainer. As a child, Harve's first passion was drawing, but at age nine, he became interested in music. He was fortunately born with a highly versatile voice, the ability to play piano by ear, and the ability to instantly memorize songs. He was soon performing with his mother at clubs, taking up guitar as his first instrument.

At age 11, Mann wrote his first songs and at age 15, he started singing professionally with various bands. His first TV appearance was on Philadelphia channel WCAU’s Think Young program, where he played upright bass in a jazz trio. He attended Temple University. As an adult, Mann was the lead male singer of a Las Vegas show group.

Later, he became one half of The Harve & Charee Show, based out of Florida, where they made their first recordings on 4-tracks at Suncoast Music Factory in St. Petersburg. These recordings were released as their first vinyl single, Haribee / Got To Turn Away, under the name "Harve and Charee." Both songs were written and composed by Mann, and were published by his company Harvemann Publishing, which dates back to 1971. They performed, in addition to other things, as Tiny Tim’s opening act and backing band during the latter half of 1976 into 1977. The other half of the group, Charee Cookman, met Peter Ward, Tiny's manager at the time, and convinced him to come and see The Harve & Charee Show at Disney World. Ward offered the duo the opportunity to serve as Tiny’s opening act and backup band for an upcoming tour through Nashville, Florida, and California. Their tour with Tiny began on August 23, 1976 at the Winston County Fair in Double Springs, Alabama. After their opening act, Harve would switch over to an electric keyboard and conduct whatever pickup band had been booked. Around this time, Harve also managed to get Tiny Tim in the studio to record several of Mann's compositions, including, ‘Haribee,’ ‘Perhaps In The Next Life,’ and ‘Any Rainy Day.’ These first two tracks have since been released, and the original acetate containing studio mixes of both songs is in a private collection, but the third remains unreleased.

He performed with Rudy Vallee, Frank Fontaine, Jay Leno, Terri Garr, Bobby Breen and other show biz legends. In 1977, Mann's play, "Straighter Than You Think" was produced at the Keyboard Theatre in San Francisco.

After performing in Las Vegas from 1999 to 2005, Mann moved back to Los Angeles to continue recording and performing his music. In 2001, his abstract art appeared in several LA art shows.

== Music ==
Mann's satirical songs have been performed on The Dr. Demento Show. His romantic and spiritual songs have been recorded by artists such as Karen Young, and Tiny Tim. Mann has recorded 23 albums of original songs mostly singing and playing all the parts himself. His music was featured in the George Van Noy film Dangerous Ideas (2009). In the Next Life, an album by Tiny Tim and Harve Mann, features several of his songs, including "Perhaps in the Next Life" and "Haribee". It was produced with Justin Martell, author of the book Eternal Troubadour: The Improbable Life of Tiny Tim (London, UK: 2016) which contains moments of Mann's work and friendship with Tiny. Mann appears in the film King for a Day by Johan von Sydow along with Weird Al Yankovic, Tommy James and others.

Merrill Markoe, the original head writer for The David Letterman Show, described one of Mann's performances as her number two favorite moment from the show. During these performances, Mann, previously hired to sing special lyrics written for show's theme, serenaded the audience with some new lyrics. He is also mentioned in her book Here's the Kicker (Cincinnati, Ohio 2009).
