= Black Cross (Hezekiah Jones) =

"Black Cross" (AKA "Hezekiah Jones", after the main character) is a poem by Joseph Simon Newman (uncle of screen actor Paul Newman), published in his 1948 collection It Could Be Verse!

Hezekiah was a poor black farmer, who worked his two acres of land; but, he also saved up for and read books. The white folks thereabouts thought him harmless enough, but that "reading ain't no good for an ignorant nigger". Reverend Green, of the white man's church, visited him and asked if he believed in the Lord, the church, and Heaven. Hezekiah replied, that he'd never seen the Lord; that the church was divided; and that he tried to be as good as he could without expecting anything from Heaven or the Lord.

"You don't believe nothin'," said the white man's preacher.
"Oh yes I do," said Hezekiah,
"I believe that a man should be beholding to his neighbor
Without the reward of Heaven or the fear of hell fire."

“Well, there's a lot of good ways for a man to be wicked!"
And they hung Hezekiah as high as a pigeon,
And the nice folks around said, "Well, he had it comin'
'Cause the son-of-a-bitch didn't have no religion!"

The poem was a signature piece of the American stage performer Lord Buckley. A live performance, in which he speaks the words over a solo female voice singing and humming the spiritual "Kumbaya" and a sparse instrumental accompaniment, is included on his 1959 album Way Out Humor, re-released in 1964 as Lord Buckley in Concert.

Early in his career, Bob Dylan performed the poem, in slightly shortened form, as a spoken piece with guitar accompaniment in a style based on that of Lord Buckley. Two amateur recordings exist: on one of the Minnesota Hotel Tapes, December 1961, and on the Second Gaslight Tape, October 1962. The Minnesota performance was released on the 1969 bootleg album Great White Wonder, and has since been included in other unofficial compilations. The Gaslight performance was released on the unofficial 1985 album Gaslight Tapes.
