= Stay Down Here Where You Belong =

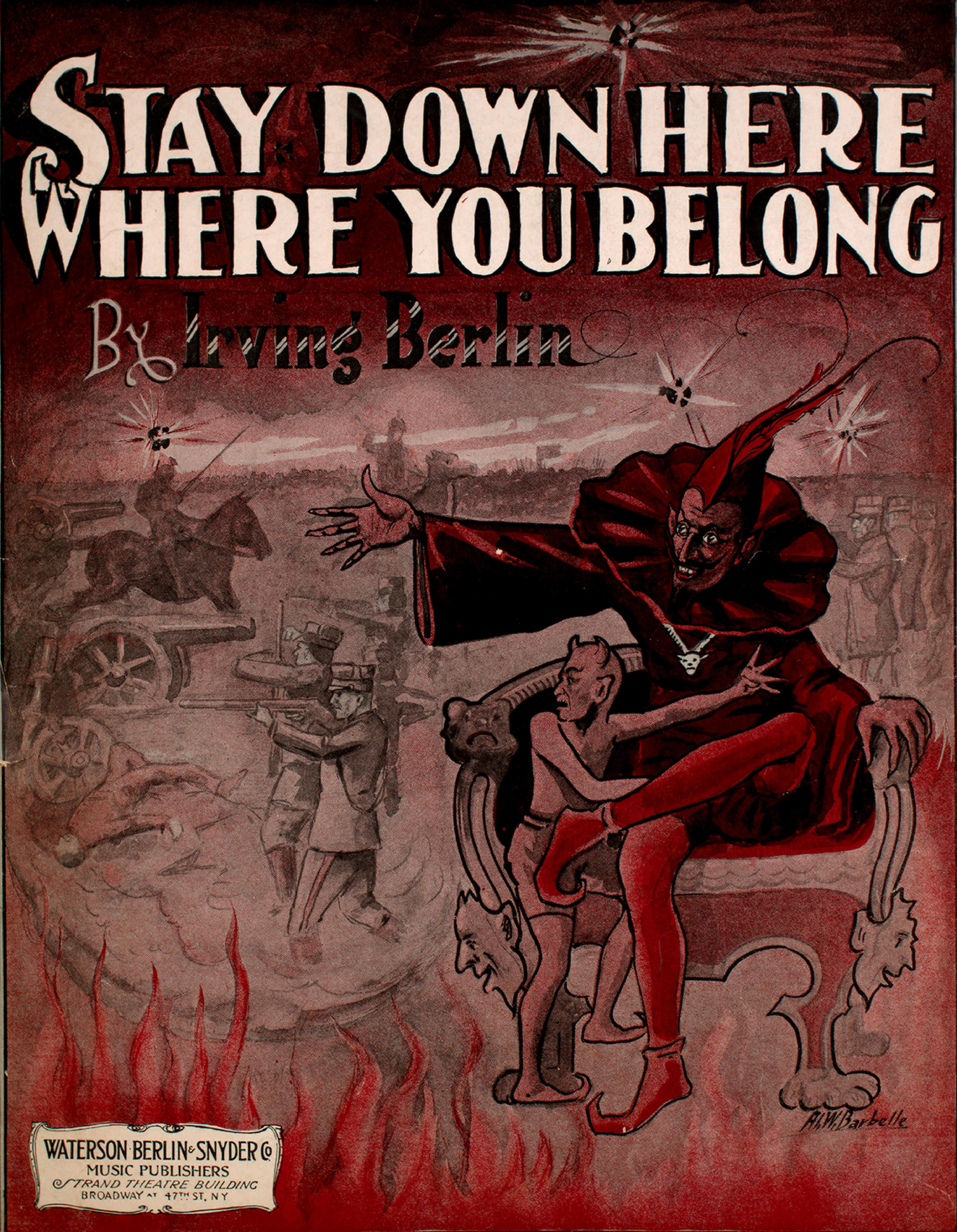
- Sheet music cover from the Lester S. Levy Collection of Sheet Music

Song
- Released: 1914
- Genre: Popular music
- Composer: Irving Berlin

Audio sample
- Stay Down Here Where You Belong recorded by Henry Burr (1915): file; help

"Stay Down Here Where You Belong" is a pacifist novelty song written by Irving Berlin in 1914, presumably in opposition to the Great War. The lyrics describe a conversation between the devil and his son, the devil exhorting him to "stay down here where you belong" because people on Earth do not know right from wrong.

Victor Records paired Burr's recording of the song with his rendition of "I Didn't Raise My Boy to Be a Soldier".

== History ==
To serve their king, they've all gone off to war.
And not a one of them knows what he's fighting for.

Musicologist Charles Hamm compared the song's topical nature to Irving Berlin's "They're on Their Way to Mexico", performed in 1914 by the Heidelberg Quintet.

It was performed in 1915 on the steamboat Providence during its afternoon concert series, where it was described as a "two-step".

While Henry Burr's recording of the song may have mirrored a large portion of American sentiment during the early days of World War I, the eventual entry of the United States into the conflict and the consequent reversal of the national mood turned the song into a major source of embarrassment for Berlin, who is better known for his subsequent patriotic songs.

=== Groucho Marx ===
One of Berlin's peeves was the penchant of comedian Groucho Marx to sing the song. According to Marx, Berlin "never wanted to hear the song again", and Marx had always been fascinated by the tune, to the point where he believed he was the only one besides Berlin who knew its entire words and music. Whenever he learned Berlin was the guest of a party, Marx would purposely arrange that someone ask him to perform the song, much to Berlin's dismay. He claimed to sing it "[loudly], too, and carefully enunciating each word".

During the late 1940s, American Society of Composers, Authors and Publishers arranged a "gigantic musical salute" to Berlin, which hosted most of the composers and lyricists in Hollywood. To embarrass Berlin, Marx arranged with Harry Ruby to perform "Stay Down Here Where You Belong." Marx later wrote, "Berlin isn't a large man, and as the song progressed, he seemed to grow even tinier. I suppose it wasn't a very nice thing to do".

Afterwards, Marx claimed Berlin called him over to table and told him, "Whenever you feel an irresistible urge to sing this song, communicate with me immediately by phone and I will send you one hundred dollars not to sing it".

Similarly, Berlin stated, "Every time I see [Groucho], I stick my hand in my pocket and ask him, 'How much if you don't sing it?'"

Marx also performed the song on The Dick Cavett Show in 1971, which appears on his 1972 concert album, An Evening with Groucho. To conclude that performance, he implored viewers to think of American soldiers in Vietnam.

=== Later covers ===
A rendition of "Stay Down Here Where You Belong" by Tiny Tim appears on his 1968 album God Bless Tiny Tim. In the late 20th and early 21st century it has also been performed by the New Leviathan Oriental Foxtrot Orchestra.

== See also ==
- List of anti-war songs
