= Livin' in the Sunlight, Lovin' in the Moonlight =

1930 song by Al Sherman and Al Lewis

- 1930 sheet music

Song
- Language: English
- Released: 1930
- Label: Victor
- Songwriters: Al Sherman (music) and Al Lewis (lyrics)

"Livin' in the Sunlight, Lovin' in the Moonlight"
Performed by Maurice Chevalier

"Livin' in the Sunlight, Lovin' in the Moonlight" is a popular song that was written by Al Sherman and Al Lewis which was performed for the 1930 Paramount Pictures film called The Big Pond. In 1968, Tiny Tim released his cover version. Tiny Tim's recording was later featured in the pilot episode of SpongeBob SquarePants, "Help Wanted" in May 1999.

== Composition ==
Initially, the song was written by Al Sherman and Al Lewis. The first verse lyrics as follows:

I'm so happy, happy-go-lucky me
I just go my way, living every day;

Maurice Chevalier is described as a "Vocal" performance featuring a male vocal solo with orchestra, including violins, trumpets, trombone, and saxophones. Other 1930 covers (such as those by the Bing Crosby and the Paul Whiteman Orchestra) have been described as jazz and dance band. Tiny Tim performed the song in falsetto with a ukulele.

On January 1, 2026, the 1930 musical composition entered public domain under U.S. Copyright Law, although the later recordings such as Tiny Tim still remain under copyright.

== Reception and legacy ==
Upon its 1930 release, the song was performed for the Paramount Pictures film The Big Pond. The 1968 cover which Tiny Tim sang in falsetto with a ukulele was later featured and popularized in the SpongeBob SquarePants pilot episode, "Help Wanted" which aired on May 1, 1999. Classic Rock History critic Millie Zeiler rated it as 2nd best song at "Top 10 Tiny Tim Songs". In November 2023, The Fader described The Scary Jokes' cover as "disarmingly catchy cyborg-pop that features polyphonic robotic vocals" which matches the "Tiny Tim's ultra-positivity anthem". The Scary Jokes noted that their version was inspired by Spongebob SquarePants episode during their childhood. The Scary Jokes also noted that they were drawn to the song's "vibrant undercurrent of queer joy" and intended for their version to embrace "the confidence and defiance of being openly queer".

== Other recordings ==
- Bing Crosby and the Paul Whiteman Orchestra - recorded on March 22, 1930 by the label Columbia Records.
- Maurice Chevalier - recorded in April 1930 on the Victor Records label.
- Hotel Pennsylvania Music by the label Columbia Records.
- Bernie Cummins and his New Yorker Hotel Orchestra by the Victor Records label.
- Al Bowlly with Les Allen - recorded in October 1930 (see Al Bowlly Discography).
- Tiny Tim - recorded a cover version on his God Bless Tiny Tim album in 1968.
- The Scary Jokes - recorded a Tiny Tim's cover version that was featured on FADER & Friends Vol. 1 compilation in November 2023.

== Charting versions ==
According to research by Joel Whitburn:

Month/year charted	Artist	Peak position	Weeks charted
June 1930	Bing Crosby and the Paul Whiteman Orchestra	16	2
July 1930	Bernie Cummins and his New Yorker Hotel Orchestra	20	1
