= Tiny Tim's 2nd Album =

Studio album by Tiny Tim
- Released: November 1968
- Genre: Outsider; psychedelic pop; traditional pop
- Length: 44:02
- Label: Reprise
- Producer: Richard Perry

Tiny Tim chronology
God Bless Tiny Tim (1968)	Tiny Tim's 2nd Album (1968)	For All My Little Friends (1969)

Professional ratings
Review scores
Source	Rating
AllMusic	link

Tiny Tim's 2nd Album is the second album by Tiny Tim, released in 1968 on the Reprise label.

This album was produced by Richard Perry, who produced his first album, God Bless Tiny Tim. The album did not have as much success as the original, and many of the songs are recorded in a more serious tone, using less of Tiny Tim's iconic falsetto singing.

The album featured covers of songs such as Great Balls of Fire.

== Track listing ==
=== Side one ===
1. "Come To The Ball" – 0:55
2. "My Dreams Are Getting Better All The Time" – 1:52
3. "We Love It" – 2:52
4. "When I Walk With You" – 2:32
5. "Community" – 2:14
6. "She's Just Laughing At Me" – 2:22
7. "Have You Seen My Little Sue" – 3:13
8. "Christopher Brady's Old Lady" – 5:45

=== Side two ===
1. "Great Balls Of Fire" – 3:19
2. "Neighborhood Children" – 4:07
3. "I Can't Help But Wonder (Where I'm Bound)" – 2:41
4. "It's All Right Now" – 2:12
5. "Down Virginia Way" – 2:03
6. "Medley: I'm Glad I'm A Boy/I'm Glad I'm A Girl/My Hero" – 3:44
7. "As Time Goes By" – 4:22
