= Merrill Markoe =

American writer

- Born: August 13, 1948 (age 78)
- Education: University of California, Berkeley (BA, MA)
- Occupations: Author, screenwriter
- Partner(s): David Letterman (1978–1988); Andy Prieboy (2004–present)
- Writing career
- Notable work: Late Night with David Letterman
- Website: Official website

Merrill Markoe (born August 13, 1948) is an American author, television writer, and occasional standup comedian.

== Early life ==
Markoe was born in New York City. Her family moved several times including stays in Miami and San Francisco. She attended UC Berkeley, receiving a B.A. in art in 1970 and an M.A. in 1972. Her first job after leaving the university was teaching art at the University of Southern California.

== Career ==
After auditing scriptwriting classes and doing research for the head writer of Mary Hartman, Mary Hartman, Markoe was hired as writer for the 1977 revival of Laugh-In, joining a team that included Robin Williams. In 1978, she was part of the cast of Mary Tyler Moore's first attempt at a variety show, the eponymous Mary, along with future boyfriend David Letterman. In 1980, Markoe was the head writer for The David Letterman Show, a short-lived live NBC morning show whose writing team was recognized with a Daytime Emmy Award.

Markoe shared in three Primetime Emmy Awards for Outstanding Writing for a Variety Series for her work on Late Night with David Letterman, for which she was the original head writer. She engineered most of the original concepts and architecture for the ground-breaking late-night talk show and created the segment "Stupid Pet Tricks", as well as "Stupid Human Tricks" and "Viewer Mail". Many of the ideas behind the remote segments outside the studio came from Markoe, who also won a Writers Guild award for her writing/performing work on HBO's Not Necessarily the News.

She has also written for television shows such as Newhart, Sex and the City, and Moonlighting. She appeared on-camera as a lifestyle reporter at KCOP-TV in Los Angeles, then for Michael Moore's NBC show TV Nation, and worked on other magazine shows such as Lifetime Magazine. In the early 1990s she wrote and directed a number of HBO and Cinemax comedy specials. She appeared in two episodes of Space Ghost Coast to Coast from 1997 to 1998 as the unwilling subject of the eponymous late night talk show host's affections.

In 2005, Markoe was a regular panelist on Animal Planet's Who Gets the Dog? She has had a number of columns and written for many periodicals, including Rolling Stone, Time, New York Woman, New Woman, U.S. News & World Report, Us, People, Esquire, The Huffington Post, Glamour, The New York Times, The Los Angeles Times, LA Weekly, Real Simple, etc. She appears in episode 2 of Friends as irritable museum curator Marsha and can be seen in the movie EDtv as a panelist, as well as in the cast of The Aristocrats.

In 2020, she was awarded the Laurel Award for TV Writing Achievement by the Writers Guild of America.

== Filmography ==
=== As an actress ===
Year	Title	Role	Notes	Ref.
1982–1985	Late Night with David Letterman	Various roles	3 episodes	
1994	Dream On	Waitress	Episode: "Where There's Smoke, You're Fired"	
1994	Friends	Marsha	Episode: "The One with the Sonogram at the End"	
1997	Duckman	Skip Spike Bergenstock	Voice; Episode: "With Friends Like These"	
1998	Mike Hammer, Private Eye	Dr. Sylvia	Episode: "Dump the Creep"	
1999	Edtv	Panel Member	Feature film	
1999	Dr. Katz, Professional Therapist	Merrill	Episode: "Snow Day"	
2000	Suddenly Susan	Miss Saunders	Episode: "Stock Tip"	
2025	Hacks	Merrill Markoe	5 episodes	

=== As a Writer ===
Year	Title	Notes	Ref.
1977–1978	Laugh-In	6 episodes	
1978	Mary	Episode: "Pilot"	
1980	The David Letterman Show	Head writer	
1981–1982	Open All Night	3 episodes	
1982	Making the Grade	Episode: "Guess Who's Coming to Class?"	
1982–1986	Late Night with David Letterman	123 episodes	
1983	Buffalo Bill	Episode: "Mrs. Buffalo Bill?"	
1984	Shaping Up	Episode: "Defusing the Muse"	
1985	Sara	2 episodes	
1985	The Best Times	Episode: "The Narc"	
1985	David Letterman's Holiday Film Festival	Television special	
1985	George Burns Comedy Week	Episode: "The Borrowing"	
1986	Mary	Episode: "The Death Threat"	
1987	It's Garry Shandling's Show	Episode: "It's Garry Shandling's Christmas Show"	
1987–1988	Newhart	2 episodes	
1988	Cinemax Comedy Experiment	Episode: "Merrill Markoe's Guide to Glamorous Living"	
1989	Moonlighting	Episode: "When Girls Collide"	
1989–1990	Not Necessarily the News	9 episodes	
1999	Sex and the City	Episode: "The Fuck Buddy"	

== Personal life ==
She and David Letterman were involved romantically from 1978 to 1988, after which Markoe moved to California to continue her writing career. She wrote about the relationship several years later in essays in the book Cool, Calm, and Contentious, giving him the pseudonym "Bobby".

Markoe lives in Malibu with musician Andy Prieboy and four dogs.

== Awards and nominations ==
Year	Association	Category	Project	Result	Ref.
1984	Primetime Emmy Awards	Outstanding Writing for a Variety Series	Late Night with David Letterman (episode: "312")	Won	
1984	Primetime Emmy Awards	Outstanding Writing for a Variety Series	Late Night with David Letterman (episode: "285")	Nominated	
1984	Primetime Emmy Awards	Outstanding Writing for a Variety Series	Late Night with David Letterman (episode: "291")	Nominated	
1985	Primetime Emmy Awards	Outstanding Writing for a Variety Series	Late Night with David Letterman (episode: "Late Night in Los Angeles")	Nominated	
1985	Primetime Emmy Awards	Outstanding Writing for a Variety Series	Late Night with David Letterman (episode: "The Late Night Morning Show")	Nominated	
1986	Primetime Emmy Awards	Outstanding Writing for a Variety Series	Late Night with David Letterman (episode: "4th Anniversary Special")	Won	
1989	Writers Guild of America Award	Variety - Musical	Not Necessarily the News	Won	
2020	Laurel Award	Paddy Chayefsky Award	Television Writing Achievement	Won	

== Bibliography ==
=== Novels ===
- It's My F---ing Birthday (2002)
- The Psycho Ex Game: A Novel (with Andy Prieboy) (2004)
- Walking in Circles Before Lying Down: A Novel (2006)
- Nose Down, Eyes Up: A Novel (2008)

=== Nonfiction ===
- Late Night with David Letterman: The Book (with David Letterman) (1985)
- Merrill Markoe's Guide to Love (1997)
- We Saw Scenery: The Early Diaries of Merrill Markoe (2020)

=== Essay collections ===
- What the Dogs Have Taught Me: And Other Amazing Things I've Learned (1992)
- How to Be Hap-Hap-Happy Like Me! (1994)
- Cool, Calm & Contentious (2011)
