= Biff Rose =

American comedian and singer-songwriter (1937–2023)

Background information
- Born: Paul Conrad Rose III; October 15, 1937; New Orleans, Louisiana, U.S.
- Died: July 25, 2023 (aged 85) Madison, Wisconsin, U.S.
- Occupations: Comedian; singer-songwriter
- Instruments: Vocals; piano
- Years active: 1964–2023
- Labels: Tetragrammaton; Buddah; United Artists; Pacific Arts; RPM

Biff Rose, born Paul Conrad Rose III (October 15, 1937 – July 25, 2023), was an American comedian and singer-songwriter.

== Biography ==
Rose was born in New Orleans, Louisiana on October 15, 1937. After moving to New york, he joined the Greenwich Village folk scene as a banjo-playing singer/comedian. His popularity led to a New York Times profile. Rose used the profile to generate momentum in his career. He moved to Hollywood where he worked as an actor and writer. While working in television, Rose met Paul Williams. The duo started a short songwriting partnership and composed several songs including ‘Fill Your Heart’, which was covered by David Bowie and ‘When Love is Far Away’, featured in Crazy Rich Asians.

After releasing his debut album in 1968 Rose made a handful of appearances on Johnny Carson's The Tonight Show. After the Carson exposure, Rose performed on several other TV programs including The Smothers Brothers Comedy Hour, American Bandstand, and Playboy After Dark.

Biff Rose died from liver cancer at 85 in 2023.

== Music ==
Rose's first release was 1968's The Thorn in Mrs. Rose's Side, which contained the song "Buzz the Fuzz".

The song "Fill Your Heart" is Rose's best known composition. Co-written by Paul Williams, the song was covered by Tiny Tim on the B-side of his 1968 hit single "Tiptoe through the Tulips".

David Bowie recorded Rose's song ‘Fill Your Heart’ for his 1971 album Hunky Dory.

Yes Keyboard player Rick Wakeman worked as a session musician on Hunky Dory . He noted, "I remember going out and getting a Biff Rose album myself as he had obviously influenced David."

A young Bruce Springsteen opened up for Biff Rose at Max's Kansas City in February 1973. In attendance that evening was David Bowie who had gone specifically to see Biff.

Rose's songs have been recorded by John Denver, Vetiver (band) and Pat Boone. Cat Stevens counts Rose as an influence.

== Racist Statements ==
In October 2017, Indy Week pointed out that Rose's website contained "blatantly racist and anti-Semitic material." Interviewer Nate Waggoner said Rose "expresses some views that are definitely not my own." In a published emailed rebuttal, Rose offered racist ideas about Islam as a defense against being anti-Semitic. He continued to post racist and antisemitic language and ideas on his websites and social media accounts, including drawings that used visual ethnic stereotypes and graphic depictions of homophobia and misogyny.

== Full-length releases ==
Year	Title	Chart positions	
Year	Title	US	US CB
1968	The Thorn in Mrs. Rose's Side	75	89
1969	Children of Light	181	—
1970	Biff Rose (Note: some copies titled Ride On)	—	—
1971	Half Live at the Bitter End	—	—
1972	Uncle Jesus, Aunty Christ	—	—
1973	Hamburger Blues	—	—
1978	Roast Beef	—	—
1979	Thee Messiah Album/Live at Gatsby's	—	—
