= What Kind of an American Are You? =

1917 song composed by Albert Von Tilzer

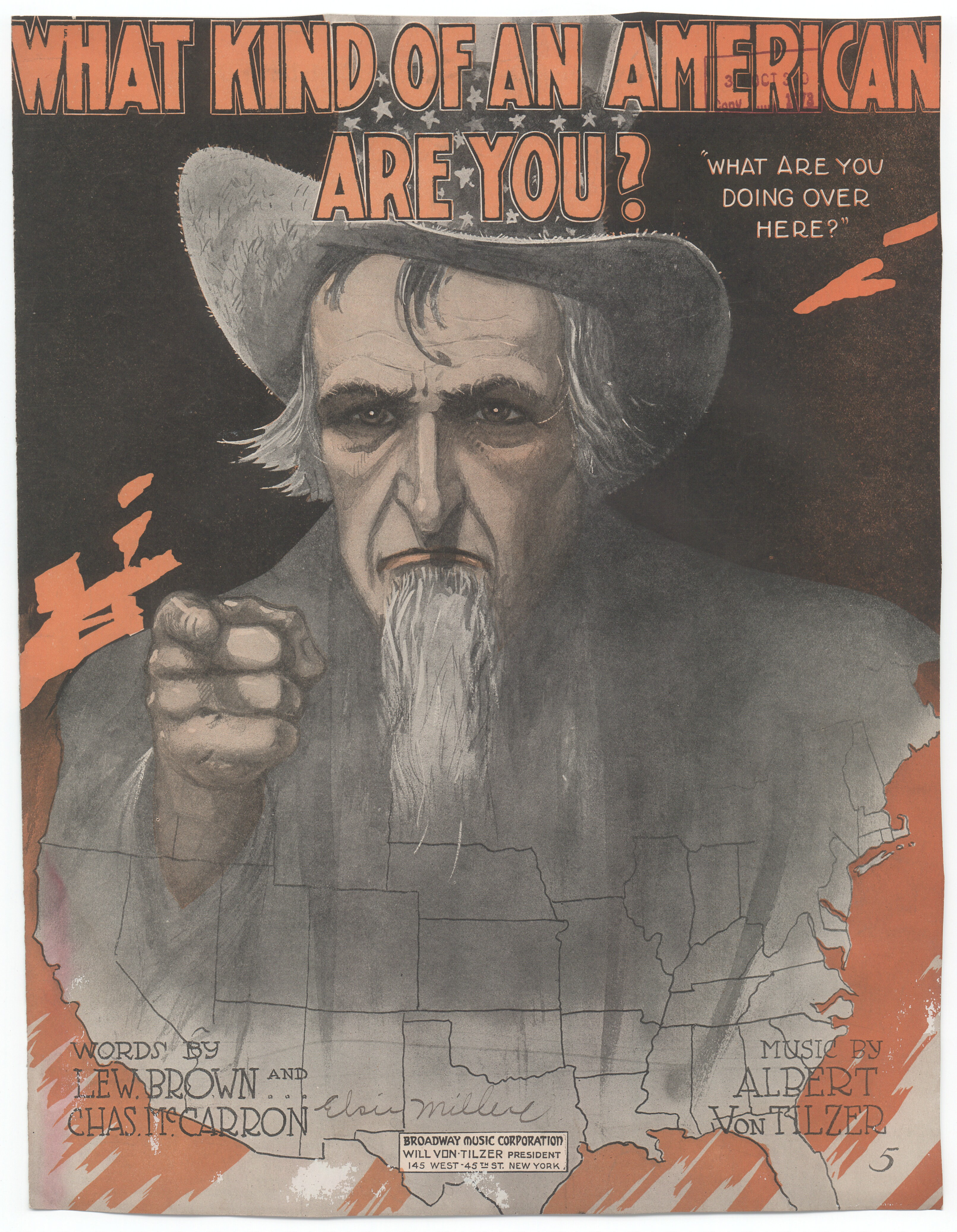
- Sheet music cover of "What Kind of an American Are You?"

Song
- Released: 1917
- Label: Broadway Music Co.
- Composer(s): Albert Von Tilzer
- Lyricist(s): Lew Brown and Charles R. McCarron

"What Kind of an American Are You?", also known as "What Kind of American Are You?", is a World War I era song released in 1917. Albert Von Tilzer composed the music. Lew Brown and Charles R. McCarron wrote the lyrics. The song was published by Broadway Music Co. of New York, New York. On the cover is a gray drawing of Uncle Sam pointing. A map of the United States is featured on the lower half of the cover. The song was written for voice and piano.

The sheet music can be found at the Pritzker Military Museum & Library.

== Analysis ==
The song urges Americans (specifically immigrants) to use this war to prove their loyalty to the United States; whether that may be by fighting or by simply standing behind the US's actions. For those who show no support, this question is posed: "What are you doing over here?" It upholds the "us-against-them" mentality; the "them" in this case is Germany. The chorus is as follows:

What kind of an American are you?
It's time to show what you intend to do
If they trample on Old Glory will you think that they are right,
Or will you stand behind your land and fight with all your might?
What kind of an American are you?
That's a question you'll have to answer to
If the Star Spangled Banner don't make you stand and cheer,
Then what are you doing over here?
