= Wonderful World of Romance =

Studio album by Tiny Tim
- Released: 1980
- Genre: Novelty
- Length: 27:34
- Label: Street of Dreams
- Producer: Martin Sharp

Tiny Tim chronology
For All My Little Friends (1969)	Wonderful World of Romance (1980)	Chameleon (1980)

Wonderful World of Romance is the fourth album by Tiny Tim. Released in 1980, this was Tiny Tim's first album not to be released on Reprise Records.

The album was recorded at EMI Australia, with only 200 pressings.

== Track listing ==
1. "Wonderful World of Romance" – 2:38
2. "She's A Kind of Old Fashioned Girl" – 2:45
3. "Love You, Funny Thing" – 2:42
4. "As You Desire Me" – 2:00
5. "Auf Wiedersehen" – 2:12
6. "Goodnight, Sweetheart" – 1:33
7. "Stand Up And Sing For Your Father" – 2:28
8. "Memories of France" – 3:40
9. "When You Look In The Heart of a Rose" – 2:32
10. "That Wonderful Mother of Mine" – 2:32
11. "For The Sake of Auld Lang Syne" – 2:32
