= God Bless Tiny Tim =

Studio album by Tiny Tim
- Released: April 1968
- Recorded: December 11, 1967 – February 1968
- Studios: TTG Studios, Los Angeles
- Genres: Outsider; psychedelic pop; traditional pop
- Length: 41:48
- Label: Reprise
- Producer: Richard Perry

Tiny Tim chronology
God Bless Tiny Tim (1968)	Tiny Tim's 2nd Album (1968)

Professional ratings
Review scores
Source	Rating
AllMusic	link

God Bless Tiny Tim is the debut studio album by American musician Tiny Tim, released in 1968 by Reprise. It contains a variety of contemporary and traditional pop standards, including his signature hit song "Tiptoe Through The Tulips", which was a Billboard Hot 100 top 20 hit single. God Bless Tiny Tim reached No. 7 on the US Billboard Top LPs chart during a 32-week run.

The songs were written by a variety of composers, most from the early 20th century, and most rather obscure; however, "I Got You Babe" was by Sonny Bono, and "Stay Down Here Where You Belong" was by Irving Berlin.

God Bless Tiny Tim was not available on compact disc until 1998, when in it was issued in Japan only; in 2013, the album was reissued on CD worldwide with eleven bonus tracks including alternate and instrumental versions of the album's songs as well as non-album singles.

== Background ==
The album was produced by Richard Perry, who had produced Captain Beefheart's first album Safe as Milk and later produced albums by Barbra Streisand, Harry Nilsson, Rod Stewart, Carly Simon and Ringo Starr. The arrangements are by Artie Butler.

For some of the album, Tiny Tim sings in his unusual falsetto style. However, on a number of songs ("Stay Down Here Where You Belong", "The Coming Home Party" and others) he sings in a rich baritone, demonstrating his voice's range. In "On the Old Front Porch", "Daddy, Daddy, What Is Heaven Like?" and on "I Got You Babe", he sings both baritone and falsetto, alternating between the two. A joke in "I Got You Babe" is revealed in the last words where both baritone and falsetto voices unexpectedly sing at once, revealing the apparently agile duet is actually himself singing double-tracked.

== Track listing ==
Side one
No.	Title	Writer(s)	Length
1.	"Welcome to My Dream"	Jimmy Van Heusen, Johnny Burke	1:27
2.	"Tip-Toe Thru' the Tulips with Me"	Al Dubin, Joe Burke	1:51
3.	"Livin' in the Sunlight, Lovin' in the Moonlight"	Al Lewis, Al Sherman	2:06
4.	"On the Old Front Porch"	Bobby Heath, Arthur Lange	3:40
5.	"The Viper"	Norman Blagman	2:23
6.	"Stay Down Here Where You Belong"	Irving Berlin	2:40
7.	"Then I'd Be Satisfied with Life"	George M. Cohan	2:52
8.	"Strawberry Tea"	Gordon Alexander	3:23

Side two
No.	Title	Writer(s)	Length
1.	"The Other Side"	Bill Dorsey	4:32
2.	"Ever Since You Told Me That You Love Me (I'm a Nut)"	Edgar Leslie, Grant Clarke, Jean Schwartz	2:42
3.	"Daddy, Daddy, What Is Heaven Like?"	Art Wayne	2:23
4.	"The Coming Home Party"	Diane Hildebrand, Jack Keller	3:01
5.	"Fill Your Heart"	Biff Rose, Paul Williams	3:09
6.	"I Got You, Babe"	Sonny Bono	2:13
7.	"This Is All I Ask"	Gordon Jenkins	3:20
