= On the Good Ship Lollipop =

1934 song by Richard A. Whiting and Sidney Clare, performed by Shirley Temple

Song by Shirley Temple
- Published: 1934
- Composer: Richard A. Whiting
- Lyricist: Sidney Clare

"On the Good Ship Lollipop" is a song composed by Richard A. Whiting with lyrics by Sidney Clare. It was the signature song of child actress Shirley Temple. Temple first sang it in the 1934 film Bright Eyes.

In the song, the "Good Ship Lollipop" travels to a candy land. The "ship" referred to in the song is an aircraft; the scene in Bright Eyes where the song appears takes place on a taxiing American Airlines Douglas DC-2.

400,000 copies of the sheet music, published by Sam Fox Publishing Company, were sold, and one recording by Mae Questel (the cartoon voice of Betty Boop and Olive Oyl) reputedly sold more than two million copies. It finished at #69 in the survey AFI's 100 Years...100 Songs of top tunes in cinema in the United States in June 2004.

== In popular culture ==
In the 1949 film You're my Everything, the song is performed as a minstrel show in a dream in a movie-within-a-movie. It is a fantasy sequence on a candy-themed boat and the entire crew is in Blackface.

Tiny Tim presented a version of the song in his first appearance in Rowan & Martin's Laugh-In in January 1968.

In the George R. R. Martin novelette "A Peripheral Affair," published in the January 1973 edition of Asimov’s The Magazine of Fantasy and Science Fiction, a spaceship appears with the name "Good Ship Lollipop."

In February 1974, the song was parodied on an episode of The Brady Bunch, the episode being "The Snooperstar" in which Cindy becomes convinced that Mike's fussy client Penelope Fletcher (Natalie Schafer) is a talent scout and is trying to make her into the next Shirley Temple.

Helen Mirren sings it in 1980's The Fiendish Plot of Dr. Fu Manchu.

The moniker "Good Ship Lollipop" was famously used by Chicago Outfit underboss Ernest "Rocky" Infelice and his inner circle to refer to the Cicero Crew, which he ran in the mid-to-late 1980s with his second in command, Salvatore "Solly D" DeLaurentis. It is unknown as to how the crew gained the nickname.

In the 1988 Star Trek: The Next Generation episode "The Arsenal of Freedom", Commander Riker is able to outwit an artificially intelligent hologram masquerading as the captain of another starship by claiming that he is from the Lollipop, which Riker refers to as "a good ship". When the hologram asks about the weapon systems of the Lollipop, it is exposed as a fraud.

In October 1992, The Simpsons used the original recording in "Treehouse of Horror III", in which Shirley Temple was seen singing it during her concert before being devoured by King Homer, in a sketch parodying King Kong. In May 2000, the same show parodied the song in "Last Tap Dance in Springfield". It was being sung as "On the Spaceship Lollipop" by Vicki Valentine (voiced by Tress MacNeille), herself spoofing Temple.

In the 2007 film Shrek the Third, The Gingerbread Man is heard singing the song after Captain Hook threatens him.

== Other recordings ==
- 1935: Conducted by Rudy Vallee and His Connecticut Yankees, vocals by the Stewart Sisters, recorded for Victor on December 24, 1934 (Christmas Eve) (catalog No. 24838). This was very popular in 1935.
- 1935: Ted Fio Rito – recorded for Brunswick Records (catalog No. 7364) on August 1, 1935.
- 1952: Rosemary Clooney – on an unbreakable children’s record Columbia MJV138
- 1969: Tiny Tim covered the song, reaching #82 in Canada.
- 1980: Margaret Whiting (for her album Too Marvellous for Words).
