= Tiptoe Through the Tulips =

1929 song by Al Dubin and Joe Burke

Tip Toe Through the Tulips
- by Joe Burke (music) & Al Dubin (lyrics)
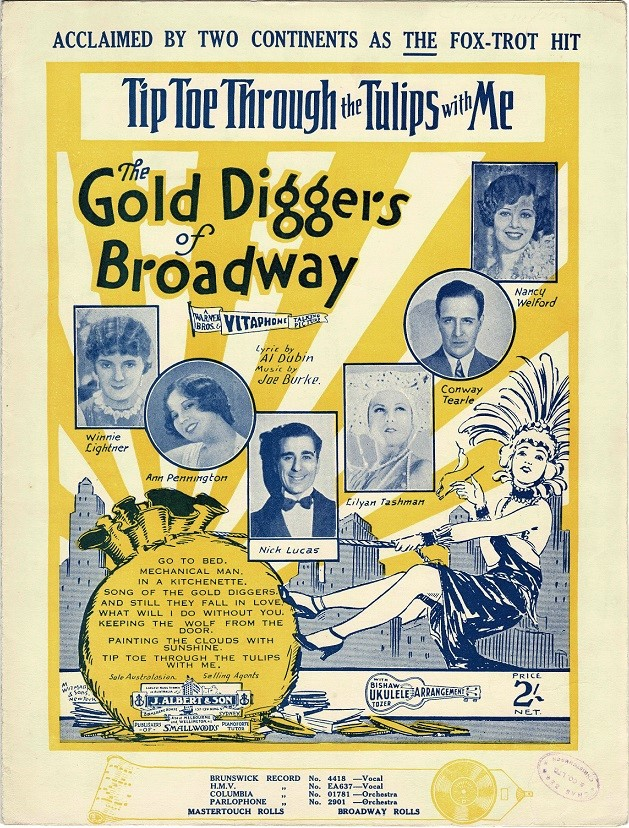
- 1929 Australian sheet music
- Genre: Popular song from the 1929 film Gold Diggers of Broadway
- Publisher: M. Witmark & Sons (New York)

"Tiptoe Through the Tulips", also known as "Tiptoe Thru' the Tulips with Me", is a popular song published in 1929. The song was written by Al Dubin (lyrics) and Joe Burke and made popular by guitarist Nick Lucas. On February 5, 1968, singer Tiny Tim made the song a novelty hit by singing it on the popular American television series Rowan & Martin's Laugh-In.

== Tiny Tim version ==
"Tiptoe Through the Tulips"

Single by Tiny Tim

from the album God Bless Tiny Tim
- B-side: "Fill Your Heart"
- Released: April 3, 1968
- Recorded: December 19, 1967
- Studio: TTG Studios, Los Angeles, California
- Length: 1:48
- Label: Reprise
- Songwriters: Al Dubin, Joe Burke
- Producer: Richard Perry

Tiny Tim began performing "Tiptoe Through the Tulips" live in 1958. He recorded his version of the song at TTG Studios on December 19, 1967 during sessions for his first album, God Bless Tiny Tim. Tiny did not play Ukulele on the recording, and said in a later interview that it was played by a "professional musician".

=== Release ===
Reprise Records issued Tiny's version of "Tip Toe Through the Tulips" as a single on April 3, 1968. On June 29, it peaked at number 17 on the Billboard Hot 100. The B-side was "Fill Your Heart", although in some markets, Tiny's version of "Ever Since You Told Me That You Love Me (I'm a Nut) became the B-side of "Tulips".

Tiny recorded a disco version of the song in 1977 for TCC, followed by re-recordings of the original for Playback in 1986, and K-tel in 1992. In 1996 recorded a hardcore punk version with the group Ism.

=== Live performances ===
On February 5, 1968, Tiny performed the song during his second appearance on Rowan and Martin's Laugh-In. He also performed the song during his next appearance on the show a few months later to promote the album. On April 4, Tiny performed the song during his first appearance on The Tonight Show Starring Johnny Carson.

At his final concert on November 30, 1996, Tiny began performing the song, before stopping and leaving the stage, where he collapsed and later died.

== Recordings ==
"Crooning Troubadour" Nick Lucas topped the U.S. charts with "Tiptoe Through the Tulips" in 1929, after introducing the song in the musical "talkie" film Gold Diggers of Broadway. His recording reached the first position for ten weeks. Other singers charted with the song in 1929, including Jean Goldkette (number 5), Johnny Marvin (number 11), and Roy Fox (number 18). Annette Hanshaw also covered it that year.

== In popular culture ==
The Tiny Tim version of the song plays in Insidious, the first installment of the titular franchise of the same name, as well as the fifth film of the series, Insidious: The Red Door. A cover version by American rock band Cherry Glazerr is played in the trailer of the franchise's third installment and prequel, Insidious: Chapter 3.
