= Tiny Tim (musician) =

American musician and musical archivist (1932–1996)

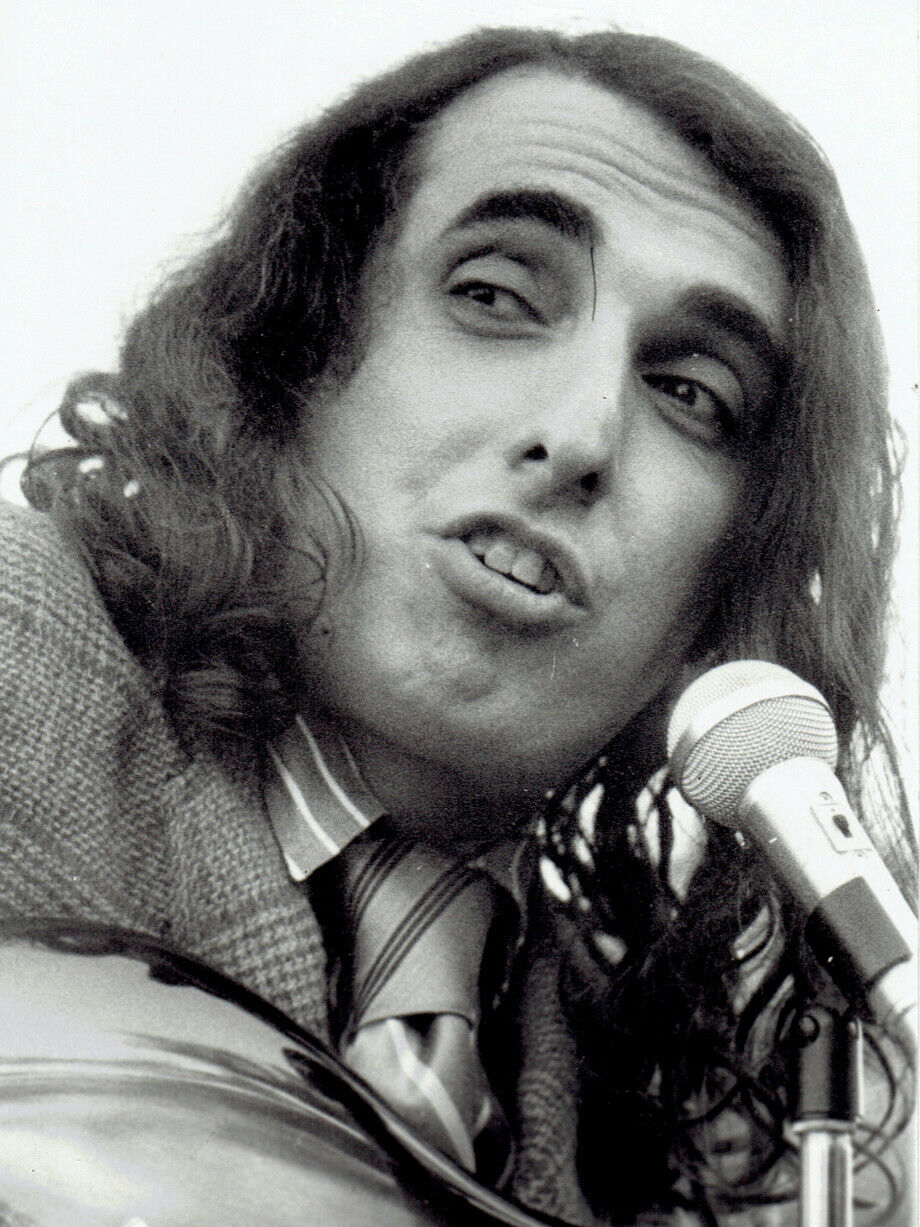
- Tiny Tim in 1969
- Born: Herbert Butros Khaury; April 12, 1932; New York City, U.S.
- Died: November 30, 1996 (aged 64); Minneapolis, Minnesota, U.S.
- Resting place: Lakewood Cemetery, Minneapolis, Minnesota, U.S. 44°56′9.92″N 93°17′57.277″W
- Other names: Herbert Buckingham Khaury; Dary Dover; Sir Timothy Timms; Larry Love the Singing Canary
- Spouses: Victoria Mae Budinger (m. 1969; div. 1977); Jan Alweiss (m. 1984; div. 1995); Susan Marie Gardner (m. 1995)
- Children: 1
- Musical career
- Genres: Americana; outsider music; traditional pop
- Occupations: Singer; songwriter; musical archivist
- Instruments: Ukulele; mandolin; guitar; violin; vocals
- Years active: 1950–1996
- Labels: Reprise; Rhino Handmade; Rounder; Seeland; Collector's Choice; Ship to Shore

Herbert Butros Khaury (April 12, 1932 – November 30, 1996), also known as Herbert Buckingham Khaury, and known professionally as Tiny Tim, was an American singer, songwriter, and musical archivist. He is especially known for his 1968 hit cover of "Tip-Toe Thru' the Tulips", a song from the 1929 musical Gold Diggers of Broadway. "Livin' in the Sunlight, Lovin' in the Moonlight", which was featured and popularized in the SpongeBob SquarePants pilot episode "Help Wanted" in 1999, was rated as best song at "Top 10 Tiny Tim Songs". Tiny Tim was renowned for his wide vocal range, in particular his far-reaching falsetto.

== Early life and education ==
Herbert Butros Khaury was born in Manhattan, New York City, on April 12, 1932. His mother Tillie (née Staff), a Polish-Jewish garment worker, was the daughter of a rabbi. She had emigrated from Brest-Litovsk, present-day Belarus, as a teen in 1914. His father, Butros Khaury, was a textile worker from Beirut, present-day Lebanon, and the son of a Maronite Catholic priest. Tiny Tim himself was a Roman Catholic.

Khaury displayed an interest in music at a very young age. At the age of five, his father gave him a vintage wind-up gramophone and a 78-RPM record of "Beautiful Ohio" by Henry Burr. Khaury has passionately praised Burr, telling Johnny Carson that "the wonderful Henry Burr's" circa-1915 records inspired his own singing style. He would sit for hours listening to the record. At the age of six, he began teaching himself guitar. By his pre-teen years, he developed a passion for records, specifically those from the 1900s through the 1930s. He began spending most of his free time at the New York Public Library, reading about the history of the phonograph industry. He researched sheet music, often making photographic copies to take home to learn, a hobby he continued for his entire life. He grew up in the Washington Heights neighborhood in Manhattan, where he attended George Washington High School.

In 1945, while recovering from appendix removal, Khaury read the Bible and listened to music on the radio. After his recovery, he rarely left his room except to go to school, where he was described as a mediocre student. He dropped out of high school after continuously repeating his sophomore year.

Khaury claimed to have discovered his high voice in 1949. According to Justin Martell, Khaury had decided to seek a "unique vocal quality", having noticed how performers such as Rudy Vallée used their voices on records. He taught himself to play ukulele using an Arthur Godfrey method book. Khaury would later describe this period of his life as a "religious experience".

== Career ==
In March 1951, Khaury landed a job as a messenger at the Loew's State Theatre, where he became ever more fascinated with the entertainment industry, and collected autographs from movie stars. Khaury continued to pursue his singing career, appearing in "amateur singing contests", as well as performing at the Loew's Christmas party. Khaury was discovered by Bud Friar, who became his manager and received "half of every award" Khaury won at talent shows. Friar remained his manager until December 1957. Khaury worked at the Loew's State Theatre for a year and a half before quitting and taking up various menial jobs, where he usually lasted anywhere from one day, to in one case, an hour, before quitting. In 1953, Khaury made his debut television appearance on the All-Night Show, hosted by Fred Robbins. Khaury performed "You Belong to Me" on the program, using his falsetto voice. He later entered a local talent show and sang "You Are My Sunshine" in falsetto, placing second. Afterwards, Khaury started performing at dance club amateur nights under different names, such as "Texarcana Tex", "Judas K. Foxglove", and "Emmett Swink". To stand out as a performer, he grew his hair long and wore pasty white face makeup, partly inspired by Rudolph Valentino. Khaury's mother did not understand his change in appearance and was intending to take her now-twentysomething son to see a psychiatrist at Bellevue Hospital until his father stepped in.

=== Larry Love, Darry Dover, and Tiny Tim ===
In 1958, Khaury began performing the song that would later become his signature, "Tiptoe Through the Tulips". The following year, he began performing as "Larry Love, the Singing Canary" at Hubert's Museum and Live Flea Circus in New York City's Times Square. Khaury was "committed to using his high voice exclusively" and chafed at the owner's suggestion that he alternate between his falsetto and natural speaking voice. He left Hubert's the following year, but began using both voices in performances under his new stage name, Darry Dover. Khaury also signed with manager George King. In 1962, King booked Khaury at the Cafe Bizarre, where he earned $20 a week during his engagement. King then booked Khaury at the Cafe Wha?, where he met Bob Dylan. Shortly after, King came up with the idea to have Khaury adopt a British persona and use the stage name Sir Timothy Tims. King later shortened Khaury's stage name to Tiny Tim, although King claimed, "The name had nothing to do with Dickens or any of that shit. It just happened to be close to Sir Timothy Tims. It made him easier to book."

In 1963, Tiny began performing at the Page Three, a club with a largely gay clientele on the corner of Charles Street and Seventh Avenue, playing six hours a night and six nights a week for $96 per month (equivalent to $1,010 per month in 2025). Tiny also performed with Hugh Romney and Moondog as part of The Phantom Cabaret, which initially opened at the Fat Black Pussycat club, before moving to the Living Theatre for a successful run. In 1964, The Page Three's owner, Kiki Hall, along with Ronnie Lyons, became Tiny's new managers. Tiny recorded a flexidisc, The Voices of Tiny Tim for producer Milton Glaser, which appeared in issue #45 of the Push Pin Graphic newsletter.

After the Page Three was closed by police in July 1965, Tiny briefly adopted the stage name Rollie Dell. In December, Tiny began performing at The Scene, which led to an appearance on The Merv Griffin Show in March 1966, where he performed "Livin' in the Sunlight, Lovin' in the Moonlight" and "People Will Think We're in Love". Although the studio audience "erupted in applause", viewer response to Tiny's appearance was negative, leading to the cancelation of a further six scheduled appearances. Tiny would return to the program in later years, and appeared in the pilot of Ironside after a talent agent saw Tiny's 1966 appearance. In August 1966, Tiny recorded a live album at "a Capitol Records studio" under the auspices of Ronnie Lyons. Richard Perry produced the sessions for Bob Booker and George Foster, while Artie Butler conducted "a forty-piece band". The planned album was never released. Perry then worked with Tiny to produce the single "April Showers". The single appeared on Blue Cat Records, but was unsuccessful.

=== God Bless Tiny Tim and peak of popularity ===
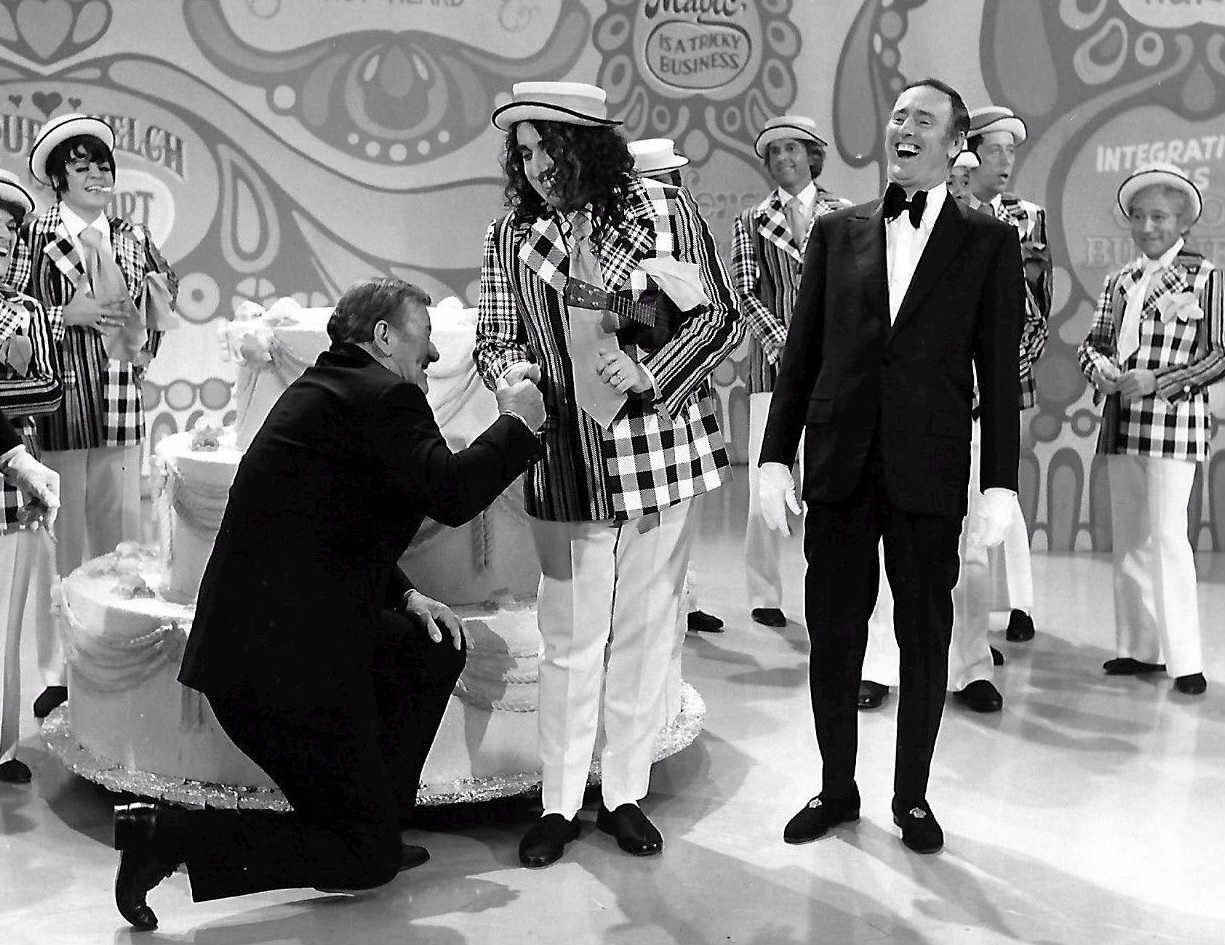
John Wayne and Tiny Tim help celebrate the 100th episode of Laugh-In, 1971

In early 1967, Tiny took part in a film Bob Dylan was making, which was ultimately never released. Shortly after, Lyons quit as Tiny's manager. In April, Tiny performed three songs at Expo 67 in Montreal, Canada to a crowd of "around 8,000 people", who responded by throwing beer cans at him. In July, Tiny was discovered at The Scene by Mo Ostin of Reprise Records. Tiny signed with the label shortly after. In December, Tiny began recording God Bless Tiny Tim at TTG Studios. Perry returned to produce the album, as did Butler, who arranged and conducted orchestration.

In January 1968, Tiny appeared on the first regular broadcast of Rowan and Martin's Laugh-In. Co-host Dan Rowan introduced Tiny Tim, who arrived on stage with a ukulele in a shopping bag and sang "A-Tisket, A-Tasket" and "On the Good Ship Lollipop" while an apparently genuinely dumbfounded Dick Martin watched. Tiny sang "Tiptoe Through the Tulips" on both his second and third appearances on the show. In April, he made his first appearance on The Tonight Show Starring Johnny Carson. Tiny went on to appear on the program 22 times between 1968 and 1974, and once more in 1979. He also signed with Campbell-Silver-Cosby Corporation, where he was managed by Ron DeBlasio and one of the company's co-founders, Roy Silver. God Bless Tiny Tim was released in April 1968 to positive reviews, and reached number 7 on the Billboard Top LPs chart, becoming Tiny's only charting album. "Tiptoe Through the Tulips" was released as a single shortly before the album's release, and charted at number 17 on the Billboard Hot 100.

In May, Tiny performed at the Fillmore West to positive audience response. He appeared at the Santa Monica Civic Auditorium in "an elaborate stage show" on June 28 to great success. Richard Perry conducted the orchestra, but remained out of view during the performance. Tiny's second single for Reprise, "Bring Back Those Rockabye Baby Days", was released in July, peaking at number 95 on the Billboard Hot 100. In August, Tiny performed at the Newport Pop Festival, followed by an engagement at Caesar's Palace for nine days. After God Bless Tiny Tim became popular, Bouquet Records released With Love and Kisses from Tiny Tim: Concert in Fairyland, a studio album which Khaury had recorded in 1962 as "Darry Dover and the White Cliffs", now overdubbed with audience responses. Bouquet also issued a single, "Be My Love". Tiny claimed to have sung deliberately out of key on the recordings either "on spite", or at the direction of the original sessions' producers, and later called it "the worst album ever created in the history of mankind". Tiny obtained an injunction against further distribution of Bouquet's releases. Reprise then had Tiny record another single and a second album. A cover of "Hello, Hello" was released at the end of August, peaking at number 122 on the Bubbling Under the Hot 100 chart.

In September, the Peter Yarrow-produced documentary You Are What You Eat premiered in New York City. Tiny performed four songs in the film with backing by The Hawks. Tiny had filmed his scenes in February 1967, while he was still relatively obscure. Two of Tiny's performances, "Be My Baby" and "I Got You Babe", which he sang as a duet with Eleanor Barooshian, were issued on the Columbia soundtrack album for the film.

In December, Reprise issued Tiny Tim's 2nd Album, which was also produced by Perry. The album sold poorly in comparison to God Bless Tiny Tim. Tiny blamed its lack of success on the release of the Bouquet album. A cover of "Great Balls of Fire", which appeared on Tiny Tim's 2nd Album, was his last single on the Billboard Hot 100, peaking at number 85 in early 1969. The album was followed by 1969's For All My Little Friends, a collection of children's songs that received a 1970 Grammy Award nomination.

On December 17, 1969, Tiny Tim married Miss Vicki on The Tonight Show. NBC estimated that the viewing audience was between 30 and 35 million.

After his career highlights in the late 1960s, Tiny Tim's television appearances dwindled, and his popularity began to wane. He continued to play concerts, making several lucrative appearances in Las Vegas. In August 1970, he performed "There'll Always Be an England" to an estimated 600,000 people at the Isle of Wight Festival 1970. The UK press announced that he had stolen the show "without a single electric instrument".

=== 1970s: Post-Reprise, later ventures ===
After Tiny Tim's recording contract ended with Reprise, he founded his own label, Vic-Tim Records, in 1971. In an interview on The Tonight Show, Tiny said that he had wanted to name the label Tiny Tim Records, but "ASCAP and BMI told me that name was taken, so we finally came down to Vic-Tim, like Vic and Tim." Tiny recorded three singles under his own name for Vic-Tim, and also produced a single for Toni Lee, who was the only other artist on the label. Tim paid for the productions, which were recorded "direct to acetate" for cost reasons, and also paid a song poem outfit, Brite Star Promotions, to press the singles. Brite Star featured Vic-Tim's releases on its "Brite Star's Pick Hits" advertisements in Billboard. In June, promoter Roy Radin became Tim's manager, and produced his third single for Vic-Tim, "White Christmas". Tim performed the song on The Tonight Show in December to promote its release. In 1972, he recorded two singles as "Grandpa Tim" for Vic-Tim, which became the label's final releases. Later that year, Tim recorded "Am I Just Another Pretty Face?" for Scepter Records, which was unsuccessful. In 1973, Tiny Tim founded his second label, Toilet Records, which released two singles: his own "I Ain't Got No Money", and one by his friend, Isadore Fertel, whom Harry Stein described as "Tiny Tim's Tiny Tim". Tiny produced both singles. He then collaborated with Tash Howard, who was a fan of Tiny's music, and produced his next singles "Juanita Banana" and "The Happy Wanderer". Both records received interest from international markets. Tiny Tim also filmed music videos for both songs. Biographer Justin Martell suggested in his book Eternal Troubadour: The Improbable Life of Tiny Tim that Tiny and Howard may have had a falling out.

In 1974, Tiny appeared on several tour dates with Radin's Vaudeville Revue show. Radin then decided to organize a comeback for him. In August, Tiny began performing with the Timmies, who served a dual purpose as his backing band and "the rhythm section for the full orchestra". A pair of backup singers joined shortly after as the Tulips. On September 12, The New Tiny Tim Show began its Midwest tour and received positive reviews. In October, the group joined the Vaudeville Revue tour for "twenty-three one-nighters". Tiny also made several television appearances with the Timmies and the Tulips. Despite the initial attention they received, the media eventually lost interest in the group and instead focused on Tiny's personal problems. The original Timmies quit the tour over monetary issues in late February 1975 and were quickly replaced.

In April 1975, a driver who suffered a heart attack crashed into Tiny Tim's touring van, severely injuring Tiny and leaving him with a punctured lung and several broken ribs. In 1976, Tiny Tim, a biography by Harry Stein, was published by Playboy Press.

In the mid-70s, Tiny Tim briefly entertained the idea of starring in a pornographic film. An acquaintance, Jackie Vernon, attempted to set up a project for Tim with writer Bucky Searles. Vernon later changed his mind about collaborating with Searles and instead approached a film producer in San Francisco. The project fell apart due to financial disagreements over how much Tim would be paid for the film.

In 1977, Tiny Tim recorded "Tip-Toe Disco", a disco version of "Tip-Toe Thro' The Tulips", for TCC Records, followed by "(I'm Gonna Be A) Country Queen", produced by Leon Everette for True Records.

In 1979, Tiny recorded "Tip-Toe To The Gas Pumps". The single was produced independently by David Heavener, although Radin also received credit on the final release. TK Records picked up the single for distribution.

=== Martin Sharp collaborations ===
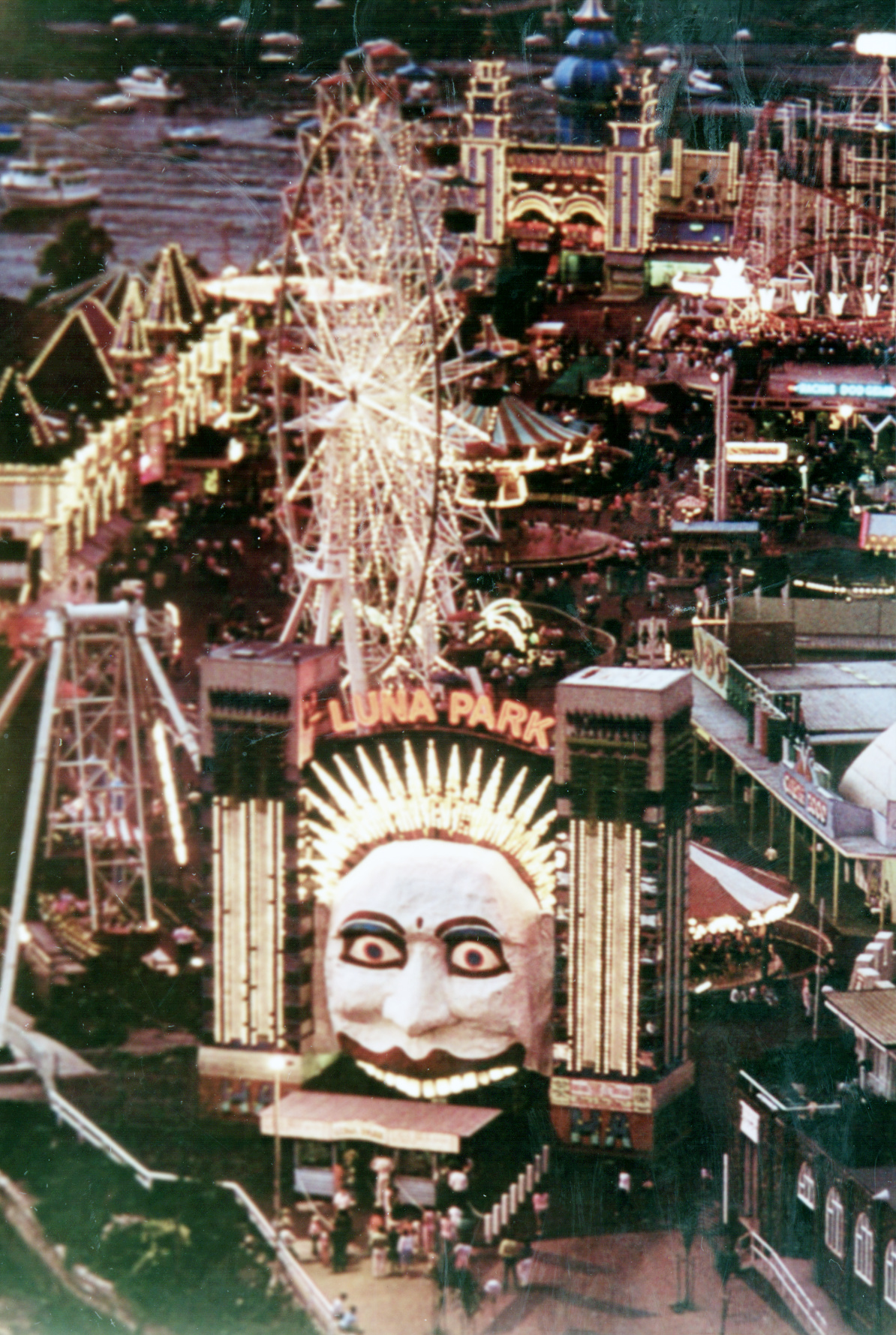
Luna Park Sydney in the 1980s, the setting for Tiny Tim's record-setting singing marathon

Australian pop artist Martin Sharp had a lifelong obsessive fixation on and collaborative relationship with Tiny Tim ever since being taken to his concert at the Royal Albert Hall by Eric Clapton in 1968. For the rest of his lifetime, Sharp constantly advocated for Tiny Tim as a genius of popular song, painted his portrait over and over, promoted his Australian tours and produced several of his albums. In 1979, Sharp brought Tiny Tim to Luna Park in Sydney, Australia to set the world record for the longest non-stop professional singing marathon. The marathon performance was filmed by Sharp's camera crew and ran for over two hours and seventeen minutes, successfully setting a world record.

When the 1979 Ghost Train fire occurred at Luna Park five months later, Sharp became convinced that the fire was in some way theologically linked to Tiny Tim's performance and also set out to prove it was deliberately lit as an arson attempt. All of this became the basis for the film Street of Dreams, which serves as both a biography of Tiny Tim and an exploration of Luna Park and the fire. Sharp never finished editing Street of Dreams in his lifetime and the film remains incomplete, though a rough cut was released for film festival screenings in 1988 and that version continues to circulate online.

Sharp went on to produce many of Tiny Tim's later records including Rock, Chameleon and Keeping My Troubles to Myself, and also brought Tiny Tim to perform in Australia several more times throughout the 1980s and 1990s. His all-consuming fixation on Tiny Tim, Luna Park and the fire continued until his death in 2013.

In 2014, stand-alone footage of the complete marathon performance was released on streaming services as The Non-Stop Luna Park Marathon by Planet Blue Pictures. As of February 2026, it can still be viewed for free on Vimeo.

A large mural of Tiny Tim with tulip themes painted by Sharp hangs in the Macquarie University Student Council.

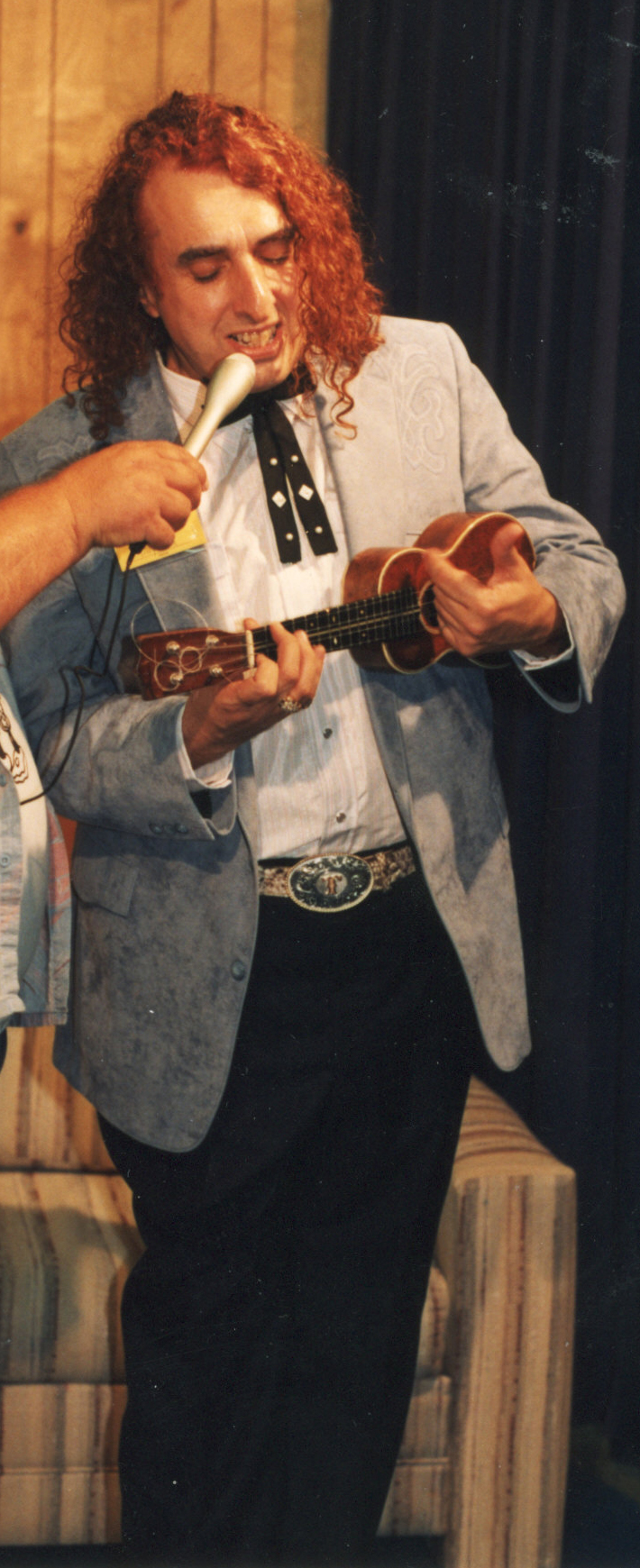
Tiny Tim performing at an event in Tennessee in the late 1980s

=== 1980s: Circus days, forays into country and dance music ===
In 1980, Tiny appeared in a cameo in the film One Trick Pony. The following year, he recorded two further disco singles for Solid Brass: "Comic Strip Man (Biff, Bam, Slam)" and "Tell Me That You Love Me (My Sweetheart)". Intended as the lead singles from two separate, unreleased albums, producer Michael Nerlino dissuaded Tiny from using his falsetto voice on the records, and launched a heavy marketing push for "Comic Strip Man". The single received heavy airplay on WKTU, but was commercially unsuccessful. Tiny also toured South Korea.

In 1984, Tiny began touring with Alan C. Hill's Great American Circus. He returned in 1985, and was paid $100,000. Tiny became the star attraction of the show and received attention from the press. That same year, he produced and released the single "She Left Me With The Herpes", backed with "Santa Claus Has Got The AIDS This Year", which later received airplay on The Howard Stern Show. Tiny claimed to have written the song years before the AIDS epidemic, and that the song was inspired by the Ayds candy, although Martell suggested he was referring to the disease. In 1986, Tiny recorded the album Tiny Tim: The Eternal Trobadour in Tennessee, with Jack Gale as producer. Gale insisted Tiny re-record "Tip-Toe Thru' the Tulips" for marketability purposes. The album was released on Gale's label, Playback Records, which produced an infomercial featuring Tiny performing tracks from the album. Gale stated, "We sold a few to collectors and things like that, but it never really did anything."

TIny returned to working with the Great American Circus in 1987, where he was approached by Gordon Stinson about recording for his label NLT Records. Tiny also appeared in director Bill Rebane's horror film Blood Harvest, where he played a "demented former clown", Marvelous Mervo. Later, Rebane developed a children's television series as a vehicle for Tiny, titled Tiny Tim & Friends. However, when production began, Tiny "had, quite suddenly, developed a fear of children" and struggled to get through the shoot. The project was shelved after three episodes were completed.

In 1988, Tiny recorded a country album, Leave Me Satisfied, produced by Don Mitchell for NLT. The album's title track reached number 70 on the Billboard Hot Country Singles chart in April. The album was never released, in part due to monetary issues, as Stinson had failed to pay Tiny $1,500.

Later that year, Tiny recorded the single "I Saw Mr. Presley Tip-Toeing Through the Tulips" in New York. His falsetto had weakened since his prime, and he struggled to maintain it during vocal sessions. Tiny's friend, Stuart Hersh, who wrote and produced the song, convinced Tiny to use falsetto on the recording, and encouraged him by playing "selections from [Tim's] Reprise albums." Promo copies of the single appeared on the 20th Century Promotions label, which was owned by Tiny's then-current manager Gil Morse. RCA showed interest in the single, but Tiny told Hersh, "We already have it on [Morse's] label." He later parted ways with Hersh acrimoniously, after a bad experience on The Howard Stern Show.

In 1989, Tiny Tim appeared with Judy Carne in a music video for his dance track "Won't You Dance With Me?", produced by Jeff Order and Max Maximum. Order said Tommy Boy Records was interested in the song, "[but] nobody ultimately ended up stepping up and buying it."

=== 1990s: Final years ===
In the late 1980s, Tiny took part in the nationwide 30 Years of Rock and Roll tour, alongside Micky Dolenz, Herman's Hermits, and other acts, and also appeared in a 3D promotional video for the tour. Tiny befriended Mike Pinera, who wrote Tiny's next single, "Dick Tracy Rides Again". The song was originally intended for the Dick Tracy film soundtrack.

In 1991, Tiny performed six tracks on Mike Cassone's The Heart Album, which Martell described as "one of the most perplexing and poorly mixed albums in [Tiny Tim's] discography". In 1993, he made a guest appearance on Laugh-In 25th Anniversary Special. That year, Regular Records issued the Martin Sharp-produced Rock album in Australia. Tiny Tim recorded the album with Her Majesty, described by Martell as "a band comprised of aging rockers". The tracklist included 23-minute versions of both "Rebel Yell" and "Eve of Destruction", as well as Tiny's cover version of "Highway to Hell", recorded in 1983. The album sold 1,000 copies, but failed to gain traction. At the end of the year, Tiny appeared on the TV special The Miss Howard Stern New Year's Eve Paegant, where he performed a tribute song to Stern.

After becoming engaged to Sue Gardner in September 1994, Tiny renewed his wedding vows with his second wife, Miss Jan, at the Spooky World theme park in Berlin, Massachusetts. The ceremony was broadcast live on The Tonight Show Starring Jay Leno on October 31 of that year. Tiny had objected to marrying Gardner at the park, and suggested the vow renewal with Miss Jan as a substitute. Bill Maher served as commentator, and guests included Bobby Pickett and Kane Hodder of Friday the 13th fame. The next day, Tiny filed for divorce. In 1995, Durtro released his album Songs of an Impotent Troubadour. The album was produced by James 'Big Bucks' Burnett, president of the Tiny Tim Fan Club, and contained all 34 songs Tiny had written for women he had met. It was recorded in a single three-hour recording session, with all songs recorded in a single take, and sold 1,500 copies. Three other Tiny Tim albums were released during the same period: I Love Me on Ponk/Seeland, the live album Tiny Tim: Live in Chicago on Bughouse/Pravda, recorded in 1993, and Durtro's Tiny Tim's Christmas Album, which had been recorded in Australia the same year, and was produced by Martin Sharp.

In early 1996, Rounder Records released Tiny Tim's collaboration with Brave Combo, the album Girl, most of which had been recorded in 1990. Tiny had previously recorded "Stairway to Heaven" with the group in 1988, who "transformed the classic rock arrangement into a jazz epic evocative of The Lounge Lizards". The release of Girl coincided with the release of Tiny's Prisoner of Love: A Tribute to Russ Columbo. Tiny had recorded the latter album in September 1994 with producers Mark Robinson and Paul Reller. In June, Tiny recorded a punk version of "Tulips" with the band Ism. He also filmed a cameo for the Howard Stern biopic Private Parts, which was released after his death in 1997. In September, Tiny's final recording session resulted in the unreleased song "The Pizza Polka Rap", produced by Johnny Pineapple for an unrealized advertising concept.

== Personal life ==
=== Relationships and family ===
In early 1956, Khaury became friends with his 14-year-old neighbor, Bobby Gonzalez. Khaury helped him with his studies and enjoyed roughhousing with him. In private, Khaury struggled to reconcile his feelings for Gonzalez with his own religion and sexuality, and attempted to suppress them. Khaury's parents grew suspicious about his relationship with Gonzalez. Khaury wrote in his diary several times about arguments he had with his parents over Gonzalez's visits to their house, which at one point resulted in Khaury getting "carried away" and hitting his parents. In March 1957, Khaury saw three psychiatrists at his parents' request. He wrote that the psychiatrists "[suggested] I go to Bellevue hospital. Tho' they did not say, if I went it would have meant I would have stayed there. But for the good Lord's grace I did not go." On one occasion, Khaury's parents threw Gonzalez out of the house after they walked in on Khaury massaging Gonzalez's back. Khaury wrote in his diary, "Out he went—and I got hit—yelling, etc." Khaury and Gonzalez's relationship lasted until 1960, although Martell noted that in 1966, Gonzalez visited Khaury's house and "made an advance", which Khaury declined. In 1994, Khaury said of the relationship, "There was a great attraction. I tried to get out of it for a long time. I can't explain it to this day ... there was a strange sensuality there."

In July 1965, Khaury met 19-year-old Barbara Williams, who was African American. The pair found themselves attracted to each other, and Khaury arranged a "spiritual" marriage with her the following year. Khaury later remembered, "She was short—about five foot three—and very dainty, and of all the women I've ever seen, she had the most magnetic smile. But this girl was also tough. She wasn't afraid of anybody." (Note: Barbara Williams is referred to in the source as Betsy Wallace.) Williams later broke up with Khaury, who had taken issue with her asking him not to use hand creams.

Tiny Tim was married three times. His first marriage, at age 37, was to 17-year-old Victoria Budinger, whom he called "Miss Vicki". Budinger became pregnant with a baby boy, but miscarried on May 15, 1970, one month after her 18th birthday. Tiny Tim paid $250 for a casket and held a burial ceremony for the child, which he named "IT". Almost one year later, on May 10, 1971, Budinger gave birth to a daughter. Tiny was not present at the birth, but arrived at the hospital the following day to see them. Tiny named the child Tulip, which Budinger disliked, but was forced to go along with.

Budinger eventually grew disenchanted with their marriage and Tiny's control over her lifestyle, including his objections to a modeling career she had pursued, and her use of birth control pills. In 1972, they separated for three months before reconciling. On The Mike Douglas Show, Tiny Tim stated that going forward, "She must stay at home and travel with me wherever I go, and, also, I just must watch over her and whatever I say goes." The couple separated permanently in late 1973, and Budinger returned to New Jersey with their daughter. One year later, Tiny Tim stated on The Tonight Show that he was willing to reunite with her under certain restrictions, among them Budinger taking a blood test. Tiny and Budinger divorced in 1977.

In December 1983, Khaury reportedly met 34-year-old Jan Adelweiss, whom he nicknamed "Miss Jan", at a Christmas party, and soon fell in love with her. The couple wed in Las Vegas on June 26, 1984. Their marriage proved to be tumultuous. One month later, The National Enquirer reported an incident at Grossinger's where Khaury struck Adelweiss after she invited guests to sit at their table. Khaury claimed to have had a mental blackout. Adelweiss planned to have the marriage annulled, but the couple remained married, maintaining separate lives and residences. (Note: According to Justin Martell, Adelweiss moved into her own apartment after repeatedly clashing with Khaury's mother.) She occasionally accompanied him on tour, as well as television and radio appearances. Khaury believed she was cheating on him and using birth control. In 1987, he told his friend Harve Mann, "I want her to get a blood test to see that she's got no AIDS."

In 1988, Khaury was introduced to 20-year-old Stephanie Bohn of the group Wayward Girl, and became friends with her. Burnett said, "That was the kind of girl he had been looking for his entire life, he said. So it kind of freaked him out." Khaury fell in love with her, although she only considered him a friend. Khaury believed Bohn and Burnett were in love with each other, and eventually severed ties with them for several years. In 1993, Khaury declared that he wished to have the message "Oh, God, may I have, in death, the love I lost in life: Miss Stephanie Bohn" engraved on his tombstone. Khaury's third wife recalled him later partaking in a "spiritual marriage" ceremony with Bohn, which resulted in Khaury reconciling with Burnett.

In October 1992, Khaury became fearful of his current manager, "a Mr. Connolly", and left New York City for Des Moines, Iowa. Khaury had accepted a management offer from a local promoter, who suggested he move there. On July 28, 1994, Khaury met a fan, Sue Gardner, who arrived with her fiancé at the Hotel Fort Des Moines, which was Khaury's current residence at the time. Gardner was a 39-year-old Harvard graduate and a fan of Tim's since she was 12. Gardner had previously talked to Khaury over the phone and asked to meet him. The couple spent two afternoons in the company of Khaury, who referred to Gardner as "Miss Sue", at the hotel. Gardner later said, "I felt something for Tiny that I never thought I'd feel again, something I hadn't felt in a long time, maybe ever. [...] [My fiancé] Dennis liked Tiny tremendously, and when the attraction became very apparent, right away, he was happy to stand aside and let me live out my childhood dream of marrying Tiny Tim." On September 14, Khaury proposed to Gardner, who accepted. At the same time, Khaury fell in love with 18-year-old "Miss Karen", an employee at Spooky World, when he was performing a series of concerts there. The relationship ended after Gardner purchased "a diamond-studded gold ring and had it shipped overnight to Spooky World". By the end of 1994, Khaury and Adelweiss' divorce had been finalized.

On August 18, 1995, Khaury married Gardner at her childhood church, the Immaculate Heart of Saint Mary Church in Minnesota. Khaury began living with her, but continued to rent at the Hotel Fort Des Moines for a time. In 1996, Khaury's interest in Bohn returned, briefly jeopardizing his marriage with Gardner. Khaury and Gardner went to a Christian marriage counselor, who suggested she put up with Khaury's infidelities. Gardner said, "I just got up and left. I screamed at the [counselor] and just went into a rage." The couple reconciled afterwards.

=== Health issues ===
In 1994, Khaury told David Richards of The Washington Post that he had diabetes, as well as poor blood circulation in his legs and feet. In another interview that year, Khaury revealed that he was now impotent, which he attributed to "blood diabetes or age". In 1995, Khaury was diagnosed with congestive heart failure. Later that year, he was told he had three to five years to live. At a press conference following his heart attack in September 1996, Khaury stated he also had an enlarged heart and an irregular heartbeat. He refused to get heart surgery, stating in an interview, "I'd rather go out with the same heart that I came in with—with no scars on it."

=== Political views ===
Khaury held traditionalist views. In the 1989 New York City mayoral election, he launched a short-lived bid to be mayor of New York City on the New Age Party ticket. He later withdrew from the campaign and said. "My campaign fizzled as flat as this beer", adding that the campaign had been his manager's idea and that he "just went along with it, but it never seemed to catch fire". Khaury was Pat Paulsen's running mate in the 1992 presidential election, where they received 10,984 votes in the North Dakota Republican primary.

== Illness and death ==
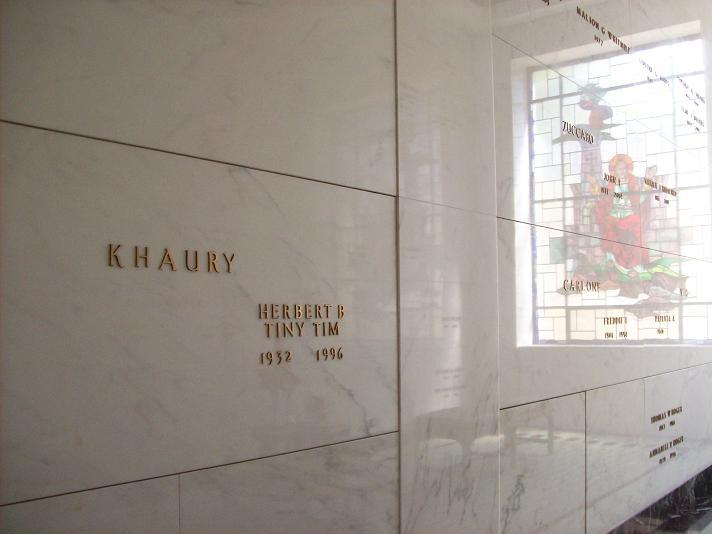
Tiny Tim's tomb at Lakewood Mausoleum

On September 28, 1996, Khaury recorded a video interview at the Montague Bookmill. He later suffered a heart attack at a ukulele festival at the nearby Montague Common Hall (then Montague Grange #141) in Montague, Massachusetts. He was hospitalized at the nearby Franklin County Medical Center in Greenfield for eight days, before moving to a hospital in Minneapolis for three days. Khaury soon announced plans to retire from performing "except for a brief song here and there". One month later, he returned to performing against his doctors' wishes.

On November 30, 1996, Khaury was playing at a gala benefit hosted by the Woman's Club of Minneapolis. He had let his third wife, Susan Gardner, know before the show that he was not feeling well, but did not want to disappoint his fans. In the middle of performing his last number of the evening—‌a rendition of his hit, "Tiptoe Through the Tulips"— ‌he suffered another heart attack on stage. Gardner asked him if he was feeling all right, and he said he was not. She then helped him back to their table where he collapsed and never regained consciousness. Minneapolis Fire Department EMTs performed on-site CPR, and Hennepin EMS paramedics provided advanced care and transported Khaury to Hennepin County Medical Center, where after repeated revival attempts, he was pronounced dead at 11:20 pm at the age of 64. He was buried at Lakewood Cemetery in Minneapolis.

== Legacy ==
In 2000, the Rhino Handmade label released the posthumous Tiny Tim Live at the Royal Albert Hall. This recording had been made in 1968 at the height of Tiny Tim's fame, but Reprise Records never released it. The limited-number CD sold out and was reissued on Rhino's regular label. In 2009, the Collector's Choice label released I've Never Seen a Straight Banana: Rare Moments Vol. 1, produced and recorded by Richard Barone in 1976. The album was a collection of rare recordings of some of Tiny Tim's favorite songs from 1878 through the 1930s, along with some of his own compositions.

In 2009, it was reported that Justin Martell was preparing a biography of Tiny Tim, released in 2016 under the title Eternal Troubadour: The Improbable Life of Tiny Tim. Martell is called one of America's "foremost experts" on Tiny Tim; he contributed liner notes to I've Never Seen a Straight Banana and the 2011 Tiny Tim compilation LP Tiny Tim: Lost & Found 1963–1974 (Rare & Unreleased), released on Secret Seven Records.

In 2013, a biography of Tiny Tim was released in two editions. Tiny Tim: Tiptoe Through A Lifetime was released July 16, 2013, and is by Lowell Tarling (author) and Martin Sharp (illustrator). Ship To Shore PhonoCo followed up Lost & Found Vol 1 with a Vol 2 featuring Tiny Tim's 1974 live recording of "(Nobody Else Can Love Me Like) My Old Tomato Can" on a limited edition wax cylinder.

In 2016, Ship To Shore PhonoCo released Tiny Tim's America, a collection of demos recorded by Tiny Tim in 1974 and finished in 2015 with overdubs overseen by producer Richard Barone and Tiny Tim's cousin Eddie Rabin. The album was subtitled Rare Moments Vol. 2 and was presented as a spiritual sequel to 2009's I've Never Seen A Straight Banana: Rare Moments Vol 1.

In 2020, Swedish journalist and documentary film-maker Johan von Sydow released the documentary film Tiny Tim: King for a Day.

== Honors and awards ==
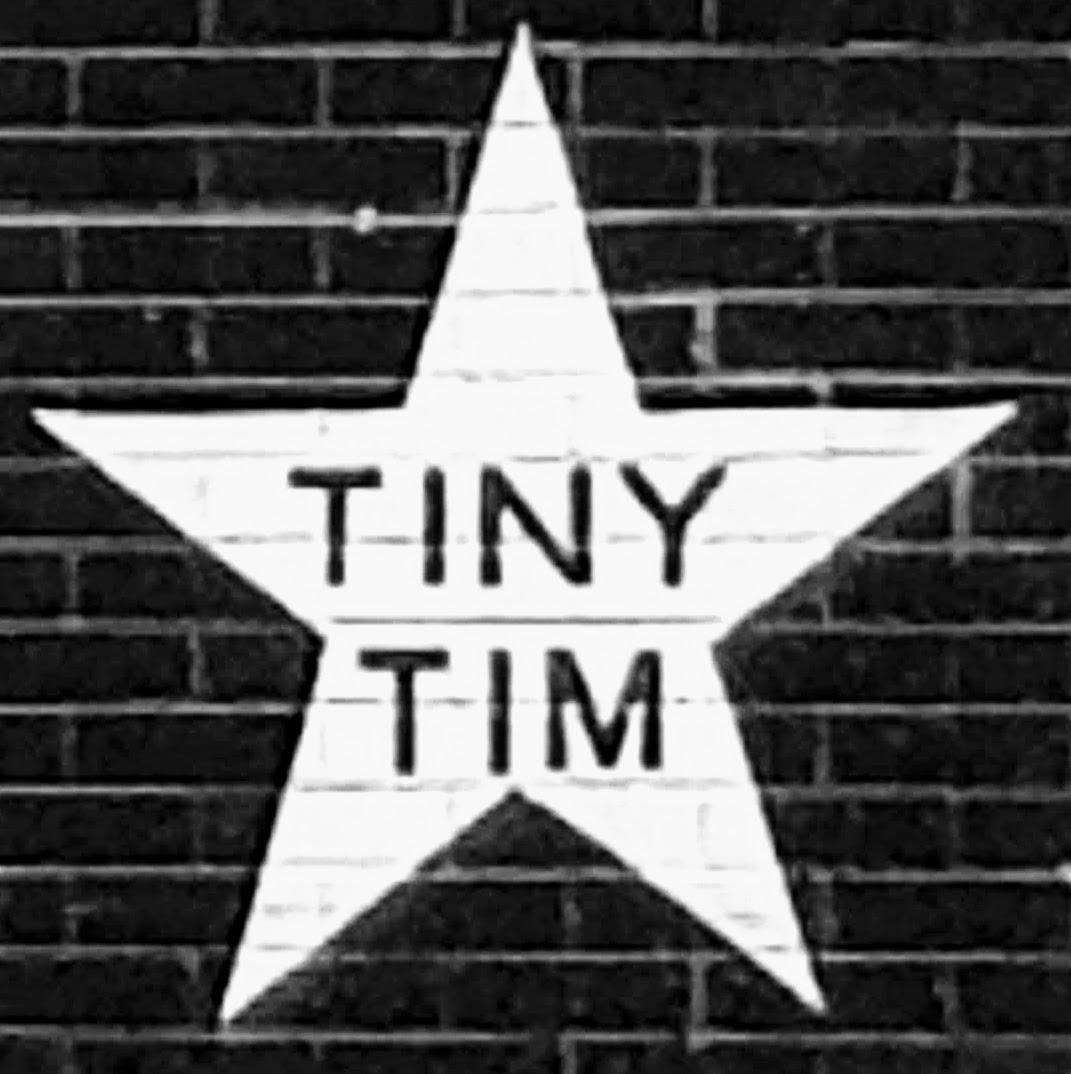
Star honoring Tiny Tim on the outside mural of the Minneapolis nightclub First Avenue

Tiny Tim was honored with a star on the outside mural of the Minneapolis nightclub First Avenue, recognizing performers that have played sold-out shows or have otherwise demonstrated a major contribution to the culture at the iconic venue. Journalist Steve Marsh remarked that receiving a star "might be the most prestigious public honor an artist can receive in Minneapolis."

== Discography ==
- God Bless Tiny Tim (1968)
- Tiny Tim's 2nd Album (1968)
- For All My Little Friends (1969), Nominated for a Grammy Award.
- Wonderful World of Romance (1980)
- Chameleon (1980)
- Tiny Tim: The Eternal Troubadour (1986)
- Leave Me Satisfied (NLT 1993, 1989), Unreleased
- Tiny Tim Rock (1993)
- I Love Me (1995)
- Songs of an Impotent Troubadour (1995)
- Tiny Tim's Christmas Album (1995)
- Prisoner of Love: A Tribute to Russ Columbo (1996)
- Girl (with Brave Combo) (1996)
