= Emotion (disambiguation) =

Emotion, in psychology and common use, refers to the complex reaction of an organism to significant objects or events, with subjective, behavioral, physiological elements.

Emotion or Emotions may also refer to:

== Psychology ==
- Mood (psychology), a relatively long lasting emotional state
- Feeling, the conscious subjective experience of emotion

== Publishing ==
- Emotion (journal), a scientific journal published by the American Psychological Association
- Emotion Music Co. Ltd, an anime publishing company, subsidiary of Bandai Visual

== Music ==
=== Groups ===
- The Emotions, a female vocal group
- The Emotions (doo-wop group), an American doo-wop vocal group

=== Songs ===
- "Emotion" (Samantha Sang song), a 1977 song by the Bee Gees, originally recorded by Samantha Sang and covered by Destiny's Child
- "Emotion" (Helen Reddy song), 1975
- "Emotion" (Carly Rae Jepsen song), 2015
- "Emotion", a song by Daft Punk off their 2005 album Human After All
- "Emotions", a song by 5 Seconds of Summer from 5SOS5
- "Emotions" (Brenda Lee song), 1961
- "Emotions" (Mariah Carey song), 1991
- "Emotions" (Twista song), 1997
- "Emotions", a song recorded by Jennifer Lopez for her eighth studio album, A.K.A., 2014
- "Emotions", a song by Love from their self-titled debut album, 1966
- "Emotions", a song by Ella Henderson for her second studio album Everything I Didn't Say, 2022
- "Emotions", a song by Iann Dior, 2019

=== Albums ===
- Emotion (Barbra Streisand album), 1984
- Emotion (Juice Newton album), 1987
- Emotion (Carly Rae Jepsen album), 2015
- Emotion (Martina McBride album), 1999
- Emotion (Papa Wemba album), 1995
- Emotion (Samantha Sang album), 1978
- Emotions (Juice Newton album), 1994
- Emotions (Brenda Lee album), 1961
- Emotions (Mariah Carey album), 1991
- Emotions (The Pretty Things album), 1967
- Emotions (Thelma Aoyama album), 2009
- Emotions (Alaska! album), 2003
- Emotions (Nine Vicious album), 2026

== Other uses ==
- Emotion, a 1966 Japanese short film directed by Nobuhiko Obayashi
- Emotion Production, media company from Serbia
- Fisker EMotion, an electric concept car
- One of the many brand names for the drug lorazepam
- Sat.1 Emotions, a German pay television channel

== See also ==
- Emo (slang), slang for emotional
