= Pretty Baby (album) =

Studio album by Dean Martin
- Released: June 17, 1957
- Recorded: January 28 and 30, 1957
- Studios: 1750 N. Vine Street, Hollywood, California
- Genres: Traditional pop; ballads
- Length: 30:15
- Label: Capitol
- Producer: Lee Gillette

Dean Martin chronology
Swingin' Down Yonder (1955)	Pretty Baby (1957)	Sleep Warm (with an orchestra conducted by Frank Sinatra) (1959)

Pretty Baby is the third studio album by Dean Martin for Capitol Records during two sessions on January 28 and 30, 1957. The backing orchestration was conducted by Gus Levene. The completed album was released on June 17, 1957. The album cover art features Dean Martin's second wife Jeanne Martin (née Biegger).

Professional ratings
Review scores
Source	Rating
AllMusic	2.5/5 stars

== Track listing ==
=== LP ===
Capitol Records Catalog Number T-849

==== Side A ====
Track	Song title	Written by	Recording date	Session information	Time
1.	"I Can't Give You Anything But Love"	Jimmy McHugh and Dorothy Fields	January 28, 1957	Session 4779; Master 16532	2:41
2.	"Only Forever"	James V. Monaco and Johnny Burke	January 30, 1957	Session 4784; Master 16545	2:08
3.	"Sleepy Time Gal"	Ange Lorenzo, Richard A. Whiting, Joseph R. Alden and Raymond B. Egan	January 28, 1957	Session 4779; Master 16539	2:36
4.	"Maybe"	Allan Flynn and Frank Madden	January 30, 1957	Session 4784; Master 16527	2:12
5.	"I Don't Know Why (I Just Do)"	Fred E. Ahlert and Roy Turk	January 30, 1957	Session 4784; Master 16529	2:54
6.	"Pretty Baby"	Egbert Van Alstyne, Tony Jackson and Gus Cahn	January 28, 1957	Session 4779; Master 16534	2:03

==== Side B ====
Track	Song title	Written by	Recording date	Session information	Time
1.	"You've Got Me Crying Again"	Charles Newman and Isham Jones	January 30, 1957	Session 4784; Master 16546	1:44
2.	"Once in a While"	Michael Edwards and Bud Green	January 30, 1957	Session 4784; Master 16528	2:54
3.	"The Object of My Affection"	Pinky Tomlin, Coy Poe and Jimmie Grier	January 30, 1957	Session 4784; Master 16530	2:37
4.	"For You"	Joe Burke and Al Dubin	January 28, 1957	Session 4779; Master 16540	2:20
5.	"It's Easy to Remember"	Richard Rodgers and Lorenz Hart	January 28, 1957	Session 4779; Master 16533	3:16
6.	"Nevertheless (I'm in Love with You)"	Bert Kalmar and Harry Ruby	January 28, 1957	Session 4779; Master 16531	2:50

=== Compact disc ===
1997 EMI/Capitol combined Pretty Baby with This Time I'm Swingin! (from 1960). Catalog Number 7243 8 54546 2 9.

==== 2005 Collectors' Choice Music reissue ====
The 2005 Collectors' Choice Music reissue added four more tracks to the twelve tracks on the original Capitol LP. Catalog Number WWCCM06062.

Track	Song title	Written by	Recording date	Session information	Time
1.	"Me 'n You 'n the Moon"	Sammy Cahn and Jimmy Van Heusen	May 22, 1956	Session 4380; Master 15482-7	2:13
2.	"Beau James"	Herbert Baker	May 22, 1957	Session 6023; Master 17073-6	2:18
3.	"I Know Your Mother Loves You"	S. Cahn and Arthur Schwartz	April 27, 1955	Session 3753; Master 13751-5	2:41
4.	"The Lady with the Big Umbrella"	David Nelson and Danny Goodman	April 20, 1955	Session 3746; Master 13724-8	2:58

== Personnel ==
- Dean Martin: vocals
- Gus Levene: leader
- Hy Lesnick: contractor
- Alvino Rey: guitar
- Vincent Terri: guitar
- Joseph G. 'Joe' Comfort: bass
- Nick Fatool: drums
- Edwin L 'Buddy' Cole: piano
- Julian C. 'Matty' Matlock: clarinet
- Charles T. 'Chuck' Gentry: saxophone
- Edward R. Miller: saxophone
- Elmer R. 'Moe' Schneider: trombone
- Charles Richard 'Dick' Cathcart: trumpet
