= I'll See You in My Dreams (1951 film) =

1951 film by Michael Curtiz

- Theatrical release poster
- Directed by: Michael Curtiz
- Written by: Jack Rose; Melville Shavelson
- Story by: Louis F. Edelman; Grace Kahn
- Produced by: Louis F. Edelman
- Starring: Doris Day; Danny Thomas; Frank Lovejoy; Patrice Wymore; James Gleason
- Cinematography: Ted D. McCord
- Edited by: Owen Marks
- Music by: Ray Heindorf
- Distributed by: Warner Bros. Pictures
- Release date: December 6, 1951
- Running time: 110 minutes
- Country: United States
- Language: English
- Budget: $1,404,000
- Box office: $2.9 million (US rentals).

I'll See You in My Dreams is a 1951 musical film directed by Michael Curtiz and starring Doris Day and Danny Thomas. It was Warner Bros. Pictures' second-highest-grossing film of 1951. Curtiz teamed with Thomas again the following year for a remake of The Jazz Singer.

The film is a biography of lyricist Gus Kahn, who died in 1941, and includes much of his music, including the title song. The story, which avoids Kahn's Jewish origins, is told from the point of view of his wife Grace, who was alive when the film was produced. Kahn was a prolific songwriter whose career ascended to spectacular heights before he lost his savings in the 1929 stock-market crash.

== Plot ==
Insecure Gus Kahn wanders into the musical publishing house where Grace LeBoy is a talent judge of some influence. She challenges him to write a love song, but she does not expect him to deliver it to her home the same evening. Grace's parents like Kahn, even after his borrowed necktie dips into his soup bowl. Grace quits her job to plug Kahn's songs on her own. Their first song, "I Wish I Had a Girl," is a hit. But after failed follow-ups, Grace cedes the publicity duties to Fred Thompson.

Kahn embarks on a series of successful collaborations with composer Egbert Van Alstyne. When tenor John McCormack sings their song "Memories" and it becomes a hit, the tongue-tied Kahn finally proposes to Grace. Later, when she is expecting their first child, her pregnancy inspires Kahn and Van Alstyne to rework the Tony Jackson tune "Pretty Baby". After Grace plays Kahn's songs for New York producer Sam Harris, Kahn gains entry into the world of Broadway. Kahn writes a string of successful songs, but his partnership with composer Walter Donaldson, an incorrigible playboy, presents problems. Kahn faces difficulty adjusting to Donaldson's erratic schedule, forcing their eventual breakup. Kahn suffers serious losses in the Wall Street crash of 1929 and experiences a long period of writer's block.

Grace secures a Hollywood contract for Kahn, but he deems it needless charity and travels to California alone. His mental block continues and he suffers a major heart attack. Donaldson seeks Kahn with a promise to be a more reliable partner, and the reteaming leads to renewed success. At a testimonial dinner, Kahn announces that Grace is the "brains" of the family and that he could not have succeeded without her.

== Cast ==
- Doris Day as Grace LeBoy Kahn
- Danny Thomas as Gus Kahn
- Frank Lovejoy as Walter Donaldson
- Patrice Wymore as Gloria Knight (singing voice dubbed by Bonnie Lou Williams)
- James Gleason as Fred Thompson
- Mary Wickes as Anna
- Julie Oshins as Johnny Martin
- Jim Backus as Sam Harris
- Minna Gombell as Mrs. LeBoy
- Harry Antrim as Mr. LeBoy
- William Forrest as Florenz Ziegfeld, Jr.
- Bunny Lewbel as Irene, at age 6
- Robert Lyden as Donald, at age 8
- Mimi Gibson as Irene, at age 3
- Christopher Olsen as Donald, at age 4 (as Christy Olson)
- Joan Vohs as Chorine (uncredited)
- Hans Conried as William Rossiter (uncredited)
- Dick Simmons as Egbert Van Alstyne (uncredited)
- Tristram Coffin as Maitre'D (uncredited)
- Ray Kellogg as Tenor Singer John McCormack (uncredited)
- Bonnie Lou Williams as Dubbed Singing Voice of Patrice Wymore (uncredited)

== Music ==
A soundtrack album was released by Columbia Records, featuring tracks sung by Doris Day (including duets with Danny Thomas) in the film.

The film has been cited by Berry Gordy as an inspiration for his start in songwriting.

== Reception ==
In a contemporary review for The New York Times, critic Bosley Crowther wrote: "Mr. Thomas, who here has his first starring role in a film, lifts it by sheer virtuosity and charm into a cheerful and touching affair. It is hard to say just how he does it. Perhaps it is partly through his eyes, which are bright, appealing and candid; perhaps it is partly through his voice, which has tenderness and sincerity, as well as the lilt of the clown. Most certainly, his talent for wholesome mimicry contributes a lot to the illusion of a lovable character in this film."
