= If This Is Our Last Time =

Single by Brenda Lee
- B-side: "Everybody's Reaching Out for Someone"
- Released: July 1971
- Genre: Country; MOR
- Length: 3:05
- Label: Decca
- Songwriter(s): Dallas Frazier
- Producer(s): Owen Bradley

Brenda Lee singles chronology
"Proud Mary" (1971)	"If This Is Our Last Time" (1971)	"Misty Memories" (1971)

"If This Is Our Last Time" is a song written by Dallas Frazier that was originally recorded by American singer, Brenda Lee. It was released as a single by Decca Records in 1971 and reached the US and Canadian country song charts. After a years-long hiatus with producer, Owen Bradley, Lee reunited with him for the single and it was her first song recorded for the country music market.

== Background, recording and content ==
Brenda Lee was among the top-selling music artists during the 1960s, having a string of US top ten singles like "I'm Sorry", "Emotions" and "All Alone Am I". These recordings were produced entirely by Owen Bradley. In an effort to expand her musical horizons, Lee worked with other record producers during the latter half of the decade. However, Lee was disappointed with her new collaborators and found minimal success with them. She then asked her record label to work with Bradley again. In July 1971, Decca promotion head, Gene Kennedy, announced that Bradley had produced Lee's newest record titled "If This Is Our Last Time", which was described as a country song. Written by Dallas Frazier, the song was also characterized as a ballad.

== Release, critical reception and chart performance ==
"If This Is Our Last Time" was released as a single by Decca Records in July 1971 and was distributed as a seven-inch vinyl record, featuring a B-side titled "Everybody's Reaching Out for Someone". It received a positive reception from music publications following its release. Billboard magazine named it among its "Special Merit Picks" in July 1971, writing that "The Dallas Frazier ballad serves as potent material for the stylist and she sings it for all it's worth." Cash Box magazine wrote, "Record has enough strength to make her latest outing a most welcome one." "If This Is Our Last Time" debuted on the US Billboard Hot Country Songs chart on August 7, 1971 and spent 13 weeks there, rising to the number 30 position on September 25. It became Lee's third entry on US country chart and second to reach the top 40. It reached a similar position on Canada's RPM Country Tracks chart, peaking at number 28. It was Lee's first entry on that chart.

== Track listing ==
7" vinyl single

- "If This Is Our Last Time" – 3:05
- "Everybody's Reaching Out for Someone" – 2:32

== Charts ==
Weekly chart performance for "If This Is Our Last Time"
Chart (1971)	Peak position
Canada Country Tracks (RPM)	28
US Hot Country Songs (Billboard)	30
