= Memories (Pat Boone album) =

Studio album by Pat Boone
- Released: 1966
- Genre: Pop
- Label: Dot
- Producer: Randy Wood

Pat Boone chronology
Great Hits of 1965 (1966)	Memories (1966)	Wish You Were Here Buddy (1966)

Professional ratings
Review scores
Source	Rating
AllMusic	3/5 stars

Memories is the 33rd studio album by Pat Boone, released in 1966 on Dot Records.

The album was arranged and conducted by Ernie Freeman.

== Track listing ==
Side one
No.	Title	Writer(s)	Length
1.	"Memories"	Van Alstyne; Kahn	2:34
2.	"Are You Lonesome Tonight"	Turk; Handman	2:23
3.	"I Love You So Much It Hurts"	Tillman	2:26
4.	"Does Your Heart Beat for Me"	Parish; Morgan; Johnson	2:37
5.	"Meet Me Tonight in Dreamland"	Whitson; Friedman	2:34
6.	"Till Then"	Seiler; Marcus; Wood	2:32

Side two
No.	Title	Writer(s)	Length
1.	"It Seems like Yesterday"	Agnew; Wills	2:19
2.	"Where the Blue of the Night (Meets the Gold of the Day)"	Turk; Crosby; Ahlert	2:25
3.	"Silver Moon"	Romberg; Donnelly	2:39
4.	"Into Each Life Some Rain Must Fall"	Roberts; Fisher	2:35
5.	"The Waltz You Saved for Me"	Kahn; King; Flindt	2:11
6.	"Drifting and Dreaming"	Gillespie; Van Alstyne; Schmidt; Curtis	2:19
