= Grandma, What Great Songs You Sang! =

Studio album by Brenda Lee
- Released: August 3, 1959
- Genre: Pop
- Length: 27:46
- Label: Decca

Brenda Lee chronology
Grandma, What Great Songs You Sang! (1959)	Brenda Lee (1960)

Grandma, What Great Songs You Sang! is the debut studio album by American singer Brenda Lee. The album was released on August 3, 1959, by Decca Records and was the debut studio album of her career. The 12-track collection aimed at an adult audience consisted of standards by Sophie Tucker, Bing Crosby and others. It was given mixed reviews by publications like Billboard and The Age.

== Background, recording and content ==
Brenda Lee became a professional recording artist by age 11 after signing a contract with Decca Records in 1956. A series of singles were issued and her 1957 release, "One Step at a Time", made the US charts. She then began being produced by Owen Bradley in 1958 and he oversaw most of her recording sessions through 1968. In her autobiography, Lee explained that Bradley wanted her to cut an album of standards for her debut disc in belief that it would introduce her to an adult market (Lee was recording rock and roll material up to this point). The project consisted of 12 tracks that featured The Anita Kerr Singers in the background. Among its tunes was Sophie Tucker's "Some of These Days", Bing Crosby's "Pennies from Heaven" and Bessie Smith's "St. Louis Blues".

== Release and critical reception ==
Professional ratings
Review scores
Source	Rating
Allmusic	3.5/5 stars

Grandma, What Great Songs You Sang! was released by Decca Records on August 3, 1959 and was issued as a vinyl LP (either in mono or stereo formats). The project was given mixed reviews after its release. Billboard gave it three stars, believing it had "good sales potential" and called it "a bright new set for Miss Lee". Australian newspaper, The Age, remarked that, "Miss Lee gives the old tunes a vocal thrashing which not all will enjoy" but did not explain this reasoning further. AllMusic gave the album three and a half stars but did not write a written review.

== Track listing ==
Side one
No.	Title	Writer(s)	Length
1.	"Some of These Days"	Riz Ortolani; Nino Oliviero; Norman Newell	2:23
2.	"Pennies from Heaven"	Johnny Burke; Arthur Johnston	2:25
3.	"Baby Face"	Benny Davis; Harry Akst	2:15
4.	"A Good Man Is Hard to Find"	Eddie Green	2:27
5.	"Just Because"	Bob Shelton; Joe Shelton; Sid Robin)	1:57
6.	"Toot, Toot, Tootsie Goodbye"	Ernie Erdman; Ted Fiorito; Gus Kahn; Dan Russo	2:20

Side two
No.	Title	Writer(s)	Length
1.	"Ballin' the Jack"	Jim Burris; Chris Smith	1:55
2.	"Rock-a-Bye Your Baby with a Dixie Melody"	Sam M. Lewis; Jean Schwartz; Joe Young	2:26
3.	"Pretty Baby"	Tony Jackson	1:42
4.	"Side by Side"	Harry M. Woods	2:12
5.	"Back in Your Own Backyard"	Al Jolson; Billy Rose; Dave Dreyer	2:50
6.	"St. Louis Blues"	W.C. Handy	2:54

== Release history ==
Release history and formats for Grandma, What Great Songs You Sang!
Region	Date	Format	Label	Ref.
Various	August 1959	Vinyl LP (mono); Vinyl LP (stereo)	Brunswick; Decca; Festival	
Various	1960–1968	Vinyl LP (mono); Vinyl LP (stereo)	Decca; Festival; Vocalion	
Various	Circa 2020	Music download; streaming	MCA Nashville	
