= Misty Memories =

Single by Brenda Lee
- B-side: "I'm a Memory"
- Released: December 1971
- Genre: Country; country pop
- Length: 2:46
- Label: Decca
- Songwriter(s): Ben Peters

Brenda Lee singles chronology
"If This Is Our Last Time" (1971)	"Misty Memories" (1971)	"Always on My Mind" (1972)

"Misty Memories" is a song written by Ben Peters that was originally recorded by American singer, Brenda Lee. It was released as a single by Decca Records in December 1971, reaching the US country top 40 and the Canadian country top ten in 1972. It was given a positive response by magazines from the era.

== Background, recording and content ==
During the early 1960s, Brenda Lee was among music's best-selling recording artists with top ten singles like "I'm Sorry", "I Want to Be Wanted" and "All Alone Am I". These recordings were produced by Owen Bradley but as the decade progressed, Lee was encouraged to try new record producers and musical directions. Lee grew frustrated with the lack of success she had with new collaborators and was given permission by her record company to work with Bradley again in the early 1970s. Among their first songs they worked on together was 1971's "Misty Memories". Composed by Ben Peters, "Misty Memories" was described as a ballad. Although Bradley produced the track, he was not given credit on the single's release.

== Release, critical reception and chart performance ==
"Misty Memories" was released as a single by Decca Records in December 1971. It was issued as a seven-inch vinyl record featuring the B-side, "I'm a Memory" (penned by Willie Nelson). The track was given positive reviews from music publications of the era. Billboard named it among its "Special Merit Picks" in January 1972 and predicted it to make their Country Top 20 chart. They also compared the song to that of selections by Patti Page. Cash Box named it among its "Picks of the Week" in January 1972, writing, "This slow and moving ballad shows that she has mastered the feeling well and should get considerable response from stations and listeners." "Misty Memories" debuted on the US Hot Country Songs chart on January 29, 1972. It spent a total of 12 weeks on the survey and rose to the number 37 position on March 25. It became Lee's fourth US country chart entry and third top 40 placement. On Canada's RPM Country Tracks chart, the single climbed into the top ten, peaking at number ten during the same time frame. It was Lee's second entry on the Canadian country survey and first top ten peak there.

== Track listing ==
7" vinyl single

- "Misty Memories" – 2:46
- "I'm a Memory" – 2:53

== Charts ==
Weekly chart performance for "Misty Memories"
Chart (1972)	Peak position
Canada Country Tracks (RPM)	10
US Hot Country Songs (Billboard)	37
