= This Is...Brenda =

Studio album by Brenda Lee
- Released: October 10, 1960
- Genres: Pop; rock and roll
- Length: 31:54
- Label: Decca

Brenda Lee chronology
Brenda Lee (1960)	This Is...Brenda (1960)	Emotions (1961)

Singles from This Is...Brenda
- 1. "I Want to Be Wanted"/"Just a Little" Released: September 1960

This Is...Brenda is the third studio album by American singer, Brenda Lee. It was released on October 10, 1960 by Decca Records and was the third studio collection of her career. The album mixed pop and rock tracks together, among them being Lee's chart-topping single from that year called "I Want to Be Wanted". The album itself made the top five of the US Billboard 200 and also received a positive critical reception.

== Background, recording and content ==
Brenda Lee was among the most commercially-successful music artists of the 1960s, with a string of top-10 hits like "I'm Sorry" and "Break It to Me Gently". Among her hits from this era was 1960's "I Want to Be Wanted", which became the centerpiece of Lee's third studio studio album, This Is...Brenda. The collection consisted of 12 songs that mixed adult-themed pop with teen-themed rock material. Examples of pop tracks included a remake of the standard "Teach Me Tonight" while examples of rock tracks included Ray Charles's "Hallelujah I Love Him So" and two songs first cut by Fats Domino: "Blueberry Hill" and "Walking to New Orleans".

== Critical reception ==
Professional ratings
Review scores
Source	Rating
Allmusic	}

This Is...Brenda was met with a positive reception from critics and music publications. Billboard praised her rock and roll delivery throughout the collection, writing, "The gal rocks in great style and the fans should take to the set quickly." Cash Box positively described Lee as "dynamic" in their review and complimented how she transitioned between styles. "She moves with equal ease through the soft beat ballads as the big beat swingers, but it is on the latter that she develops the most excitement," they wrote. Canada's Herald Magazine described Lee as "the female Presley" and complimented the "moan" quality of her voice. AllMusic's Richie Unterberger gave the album a four out of five star rating, finding it to be "significantly above the average pop/rock LP of the era". Unterberger pointed to its production choices and Lee's vocal performances as factors to his conclusion.

== Release, chart performance and singles ==
This Is...Brenda was released on October 10, 1960 by Decca Records and was offered in two vinyl LP formats: mono or stereo. It became her second disc to make the US Billboard 200 survey, peaking at the number four position. It was Lee's highest-peaking album on the Billboard 200. The only single included on the album was "I Want to Be Wanted", which Decca originally issued in September 1960. It became her second song to reach number one on the US Hot 100, while also reaching number ten on Australia's Kent Music Report, number 17 on Belgium's Ultratop chart and number 31 on the UK Singles Chart. Its B-side, "Just a Little" (also a featured track on the album), reached number 40 on the US Hot 100.

== Track listing ==
Side one
No.	Title	Writer(s)	Length
1.	"When My Dreamboat Comes Home"	Cliff Friend; Dave Franklin	2:15
2.	"I Want to Be Wanted"	Kim Gannon; Giuseppe Spotti; Alberto Testa	3:05
3.	"Just a Little"	Betty Logan Chotas	2:26
4.	"Pretend"	Dan Belloc; Lew Douglas; Frank Levere; Cliff Parman	2:53
5.	"Love and Learn"	Earl Sinks; Bob Montgomery	2:06
6.	"Teach Me Tonight"	Gene De Paul; Sammy Cahn	3:02

Side two
No.	Title	Writer(s)	Length
1.	"Hallelujah I Love Him So"	Ray Charles	2:24
2.	"Walking to New Orleans"	Antoine "Fats" Domino; Dave Bartholomew; Robert Guidry	2:31
3.	"Blueberry Hill"	Al Lewis; Larry Stock; Vincent Rose	2:30
4.	"We Three (My Echo, My Shadow, and Me)"	Dick Robertson; Nelson Cogane (né); Sammy Mysels	3:31
5.	"Build a Big Fence"	Chuck Taylor	2:28
6.	"If I Didn't Care"	Jack Lawrence	2:43

== Chart performance ==
Chart (1960)	Peak position
US Billboard 200	4

== Release history ==
Release history and formats for This Is...Brenda
Region	Date	Format	Label	Ref.
Various	October 10, 1960	LP mono; LP stereo	Brunswick; Decca; Festival; Life	
Various	1962–1963	LP mono; LP stereo	Brunswick; Life; Popular; Universal Record Club	
Various	Circa 2012	Compact disc (CD)	Hallmark Records	
Various	Circa 2020	Music download; streaming	MCA Nashville	
