= Raymond B. Egan =

Canadian-born American songwriter (1890–1952)

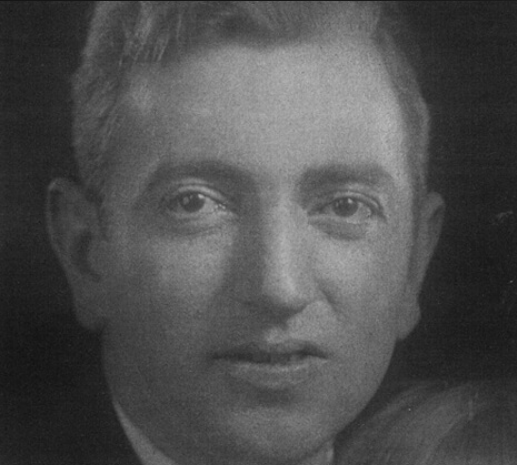
Egan

Raymond Blanning Egan (November 14, 1890 – October 13, 1952) was a Canadian-born American songwriter of popular music. Many of his songs have appeared in films and musical theatre. He often collaborated with composer Richard A. Whiting.

== Early life and education ==
Egan was born in Windsor, Ontario. He moved with his family to the United States in 1892 and settled in Michigan, where he attended the University of Michigan.

== Career ==
Egan's first job was a bank clerk, but he soon moved on to be a staff writer for Grinnell's Music Co. in Detroit.

Beginning in the 1910s, he and Whiting wrote many popular songs, including "Till We Meet Again", "The Japanese Sandman" and "Ain't We Got Fun".

Egan wrote songs for Vaudeville and for Broadway acts, including Robinson Crusoe, Jr., Silks and Satins, Holka Polka and Earl Carroll's Sketch Book (1935). He also wrote a number of songs for the films Paramount on Parade, Red-Headed Woman, The Prizefighter and the Lady and MGM's 1932 Lord Byron of Broadway. As well as Whiting, he later went on to write songs with Walter Donaldson, Ted Fiorito, Harry Tierney, and Gus Kahn.

His song "I Never Knew" was included on Judy Garland's 1950 Second Souvenir Album.

Egan died in Westport, Connecticut, aged 61. He was inducted into the Songwriters Hall of Fame in 1970. One of his works (co-written with Richard A. Whiting) named Hands In Hand Again was remixed and covered by the dark ambient band Midnight Syndicate in their 2005 album The 13th Hour.

== Selected compositions ==
- "Coaling Up in Colon Town" (1916). m: Richard A. Whiting
- "Bravest Heart of All" (1917). m: Richard A. Whiting
- "I Wonder Where My Buddies Are To-Night" (1917). m: Richard A. Whiting
- "So Long, Mother" (1917). m: Egbert Van Alstyne
- "Throw Me a Kiss from Over the Sea" (1917). m: Richard A. Whiting
- "I'll Love You More for Losing You a While" (1918). m: Richard A. Whiting
- "Kaiser Bill" (1918). m: Egbert Van Alstyne
- "Smile as You Kiss Me Good-Bye" (1918). m: Art Gillham
- "Till We Meet Again" (1918). m: Richard A. Whiting
- "You'll Be Welcome as Flowers in the Maytime" (1918). m: Richard A. Whiting
- "Eyes of the Army" (1919). m: Richard A. Whiting
- "Hand in Hand Again" (1919). m: Richard A. Whiting
- "Rose of Verdun" (1919). m: Richard A. Whiting
- "They Called it Dixieland"
- "Mammy’s Little Coal Black Rose"
- "Where the Morning Glories Grow"
- "Ain't We Got Fun?"
- "The Japanese Sandman"
- "In a Little While"
- "Tea Leaves"
- "Sleepy Time Gal"
- "You’re Still an Old Sweetheart of Mine"
- "Some Sunday Morning"
- "Three on a Match"
- "Somebody’s Wrong"
- "Tell Me Why You Smile, Mona Lisa"
- "Dear Old Gal, Who’s Your Pal Tonight?"
- "There Ain’t No Maybe in My Baby’s Eyes"
- "I Never Knew I Could Love Anybody"
- "Downstream Drifter"
- "Red Headed Woman”
