= Brenda Lee (1960 album) =

Studio album by Brenda Lee
- Released: July 1960
- Genres: Pop; Rockabilly
- Label: Decca
- Producer: Owen Bradley

Brenda Lee chronology
Grandma, What Great Songs You Sang! (1959)	Brenda Lee (1960)	This Is...Brenda (1960)

Singles from Brenda Lee
- 1. "Let's Jump the Broomstick" Released: April 1959; 2. "Sweet Nothin's" Released: September 1959; 3. "That's All You Gotta Do"/"I'm Sorry" Released: May 1960

Brenda Lee is the second studio album by American singer, Brenda Lee. It was released in July 1960 by Decca Records and was her second studio album. The disc featured a total of four singles: "Let's Jump the Broomstick", "Sweet Nothin's" and "That's All You Gotta Do". The latter featured "I'm Sorry" on the B-side, which reached number one on the US chart. The album was given a positive reception from critics for its rock performances.

== Background, recording and content ==
Brenda Lee was signed to Decca Records as a child performer at age 11 and recorded music ranging in style from pop to rockabilly. In 1959, the rock-flavored "Sweet Nothin's" became a top five US pop single, followed her first chart-topper in 1960 titled "I'm Sorry". The latter releases (along with a string of future songs) made Lee one of the best-selling music artists of the 1960s. Her hit songs from 1959 and 1960 were featured on Lee's second album which was titled as an eponymous collection. Produced by Owen Bradley and featuring background vocals from The Anita Kerr Singers, the album consisted of 12 selections. Examples of Rockabilly tunes on the disc included "Dynamite" and the Hank Williams-penned "Jambalaya (On the Bayou)".

== Critical reception ==
Brenda Lee was met with favorable reviews from music publications and critics. Billboard found the album had "exciting renditions" of popular songs and also wrote, "The 15-year-old' miss has a style and full-voiced attack that belie her age and have won her a large following via previous disks and national radio-TV exposure." Cash Box described Lee as both "energetic" and "exuberant" on the disc, crediting Owen Bradley for her performance and then concluded, "The album adds up to good teen entertainment." William K. Trosene of The Pittsburgh Press positively compared Lee to Elvis Presley, finding her singing to be "sweet and shooting" while also being "raucous and rocking". Joe Viglione of AllMusic gave it four out of five stars, crediting the album with influencing future recordings by teen performers like Tanya Tucker, Debbie Gibson and Britney Spears, writing, "Brenda Lee is the ultimate in a teen female performer writing the rules and retaining the crown."

== Release, chart performance and singles ==
Brenda Lee was originally scheduled for an August 1960 release, however, Decca decided to rush-release the album after her 1960 singles became popular. The album was instead released in July 1960 and was offered in two vinyl LP formats: mono or stereo. It was her first disc to make the US Billboard 200 chart, rising into the number five position, becoming her second highest-charting LP on the Billboard 200. A total of four singles were included on the disc. Its earliest single release was "Let's Jump the Broomstick" (first issued by Decca in April 1959), reaching number 12 on the UK Singles Chart. It was followed in September 1959 by "Sweet Nothin's", which notably rose to number four on both the US Hot 100 and UK Singles chart. The last single to be included on the album was the double-sided hit, "That's All You Gotta Do"/"I'm Sorry". The A-side made the top-10 in both the US and Australia, while the B-side reached number one in the US, number six in Australia and number 19 in the UK.

== Track listing ==
Side one
No.	Title	Writer(s)	Length
1.	"Dynamite"	Mort Garson; Tom Glazer	1:57
2.	"Weep No More Baby"	John D. Loudermilk; Marijohn Wilkin	3:00
3.	"Jambalaya (On the Bayou)"	Hank Williams	2:42
4.	"(If I'm Dreaming) Just Let Me Dream"	Charles Singleton	2:49
5.	"Be My Love Again"	Chuck Taylor	2:37
6.	"My Baby Likes Western Guys"	Jackie Dee	2:13

Side two
No.	Title	Writer(s)	Length
1.	"Sweet Nothin's"	Ronnie Self	2:24
2.	"I'm Sorry"	Dub Albritten; Self	2:40
3.	"That's All You Gotta Do"	Jerry Reed	2:27
4.	"Heading Home"	Buck Ram	2:40
5.	"Wee Wee Willies"	Self	2:06
6.	"Let's Jump the Broomstick"	Charles Robbins	2:25

== Personnel ==
All credits are adapted from the liner notes of Brenda Lee.

- Owen Bradley – Director/producer
- The Anita Kerr Singers – Choir
- Charles Lamb – Sleeve notes

== Chart performance ==
Chart (1960)	Peak position
US Billboard 200	5

== Release history ==
Release history and formats for Brenda Lee
Region	Date	Format	Label	Ref.
Various	July 1960	LP mono; LP stereo	Brunswick; Decca; Festival	
Various	1961–2025	LP mono; LP stereo	Bear Family; Brunswick; Coral; Decca; DOL; Jugoton; Rumble	
Various	2011–2015	Compact disc (CD)	Hallmark; Magic; Oldays	
Various	Circa 2020	Music download; streaming	MCA Nashville	
