= Emotions (Brenda Lee album) =

Studio album by Brenda Lee
- Released: April 3, 1961
- Genres: Pop; rock and roll
- Length: 33:55
- Label: Decca

Brenda Lee chronology
This Is...Brenda (1960)	Emotions (1961)	All the Way (1961)

Singles from Emotions
- 1. "Emotions"/"I'm Learning About Love" Released: December 1960

Emotions is the fourth studio album by American singer, Brenda Lee. It was released on April 3, 1961 by Decca Records and was her fourth studio album. The disc was a concept project that was meant to showcase the different emotions exhibited in romantic relationships. Its title track was the album's only single and made the top-10 in the US and Belgium. The album was given mostly positive reviews by critics and publications.

== Background, recording and content ==
Child prodigy, Brenda Lee, was among the best-selling music artists of the 1960s with a string of uninterrupted US top-10 singles like "I'm Sorry", "I Want to Be Wanted" and "Emotions". The latter served as the title track to Lee's next studio album. According to the liner notes, the 12 tracks on the collection were meant to "reflect the many moods that make up the American popular repertoire". A series of ballads were intended to show a more tender side, such as the title track and "I'm in the Mood for Love". Other tracks were more uptempo and meant to showcase an energetic side of Lee like "I'm Learning About Love" and "Just Another Lie". Emotions has a similar organization to that of her previous album, This Is...Brenda: Combining slower pop-influenced ballads with uptempo rock and roll selections. Cover tunes on the disc included The Shirelles's "Will You Love Me Tomorrow?", along with Ray Charles's "Georgia on My Mind" and "Swanee River Rock".

== Critical reception ==
Professional ratings
Review scores
Source	Rating
Allmusic	4/5 stars
New Record Mirror	3/5

Emotions was given mostly positive reviews following its release. Billboard called it "another fine album effort" and highlighted its use of string arrangements to help enhance Lee's vocals. Cash Box took notice of the disc's concept of tying in different emotions and believed many of the song choices showcased her emotional maturity. "Exciting showcase for a versatile talent," the publication concluded. The St. Petersburg Times believed the album would connect well with a teenage audience, especially with songs like "Crazy Talk" and "Just Another Like".

Meanwhile, the New Record Mirror gave it a mixed reception, believing that it was "not the kind of material Brenda Lee fans want to hear her sing" but praised her mature vocals. AllMusic gave the album a four-star rating, praising its production and Lee's vocals: "While it was the kind of record that could appeal to both kids and adults, it wasn't watered down, as the production on its own was pretty delightful to listen to, matched by the excellence of Lee's incredibly (for a teenager) mature vocals."

== Release, promotion, chart performance and singles ==
Emotions was released on April 3, 1961 by Decca Records and was offered in two vinyl LP formats: mono or stereo. To coincide with the album's promotion, Decca named March 29 "Brenda Lee Day" that featured a series of "sales and promotion activities". Decca's promotional department also visited various radio stations and issued promotional discs of the LP. It became her third disc to make the US Billboard 200 all-genre chart, peaking at the number 24 position in 1961. It was one of two albums that year by Lee to make the chart. The title track was the only single included on the disc and was first issued by Decca in December 1960. It rose to number seven on the US Hot 100, number 20 on the Australian Kent Music Report chart and number six on Belgium's Ultratop chart. The single's B-side, "I'm Learning About Love" (also included on Emotions), reached number 33 on the US Hot 100.

== Track listing ==
Side one
No.	Title	Writer(s)	Length
1.	"Emotions"	Mel Tillis; Ramsey Kearney	2:51
2.	"Just Another Lie"	E. R. Suarez	3:20
3.	"If You Love Me (Really Love Me)"	Marguerite Monnot; Geoff Parsons; Edith Piaf	2:40
4.	"Crazy Talk"	Mel Tillis; Wayne P. Walker	2:42
5.	"When I Fall in Love"	Victor Young; Edward Heyman	3:01
6.	"Around the World"	Young; Harold Adamson	2:23

Side two
No.	Title	Writer(s)	Length
1.	"Swanee River Rock"	Ray Charles	2:07
2.	"Will You Love Me Tomorrow?"	Gerry Goffin; Carole King	2:54
3.	"I'm Learning About Love"	Louis Innis; Grady Martin	2:41
4.	"Georgia on My Mind"	Hoagy Carmichael	3:39
5.	"Cry"	Churchill Kohlman	2:49
6.	"I'm in the Mood for Love"	Dorothy Fields; Jimmy McHugh	2:48

== Chart performance ==
Chart (1961)	Peak position
US Billboard 200	24

== Release history ==
Release history and formats for Emotions
Region	Date	Format	Label	Ref.
Various	April 3, 1961	LP mono; LP stereo	Brunswick; Decca; Festival; Life	
Various	Circa 2018	Compact disc (CD)	Hallmark Records	
Various	Circa 2020	Music download; streaming	MCA Nashville	
