= Tin Town, Missouri =

Unincorporated community in Missouri, U.S.

Coordinates: 37°27′14″N 93°11′36″W

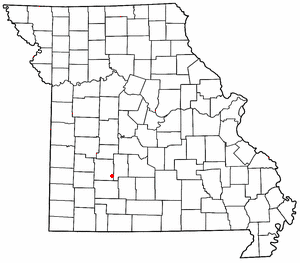
Tin Town, Missouri

Tin Town is an unincorporated community in southeastern Polk County, Missouri. Located on Route 215, it is part of the Springfield, Missouri Metropolitan Statistical Area.

The community was recorded as Half Way in the Polk County, Missouri Official Plat Maps of 1903 and again in 1939. It was officially designated Gold until the 1930s, when the name Tin Town was adopted in reference to the significant number of homes with tin roofs.

== Notable people ==
- Ronnie Self (1938–1981), rockabilly singer-songwriter known for "Bop-A-Lena"
