= John T. Hill =

American photographer

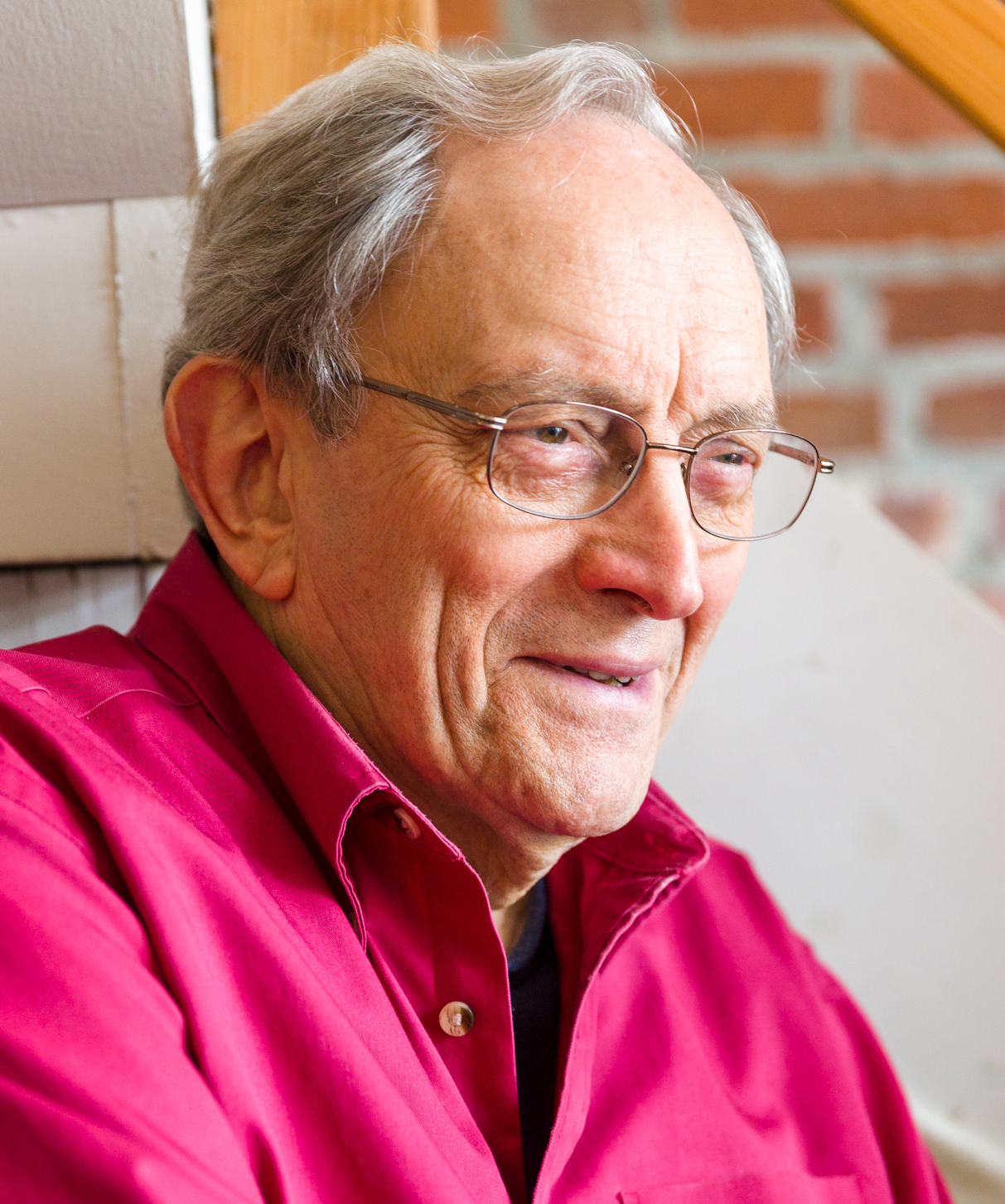
- Born: 1934 (age 91–92); Jackson County, Georgia
- Education: University of Georgia (BFA); University of Georgia (MFA); Yale School of Art and Architecture

John T. Hill (born 1934) is an American artist. His work focuses mainly on design and photography. John T. Hill has recently published a book of his photographs, Random Access: Photographs by John T. Hill. A second volume, Winnowing, is in gestation.

== Education ==
As an undergraduate at the University of Georgia, Hill studied painting, design, and photography, earning a BFA in design in 1955, and an MFA in painting in 1956. After a tour of infantry duty he continued graduate studies in design and photography at the Yale School of Art and Architecture.

== Teaching ==
On graduating, he was invited to join the Yale faculty, where he taught both graphic design and photography. His faculty colleagues from the 1960s and 70s included Alvin Eisenman, Walker Evans, Herbert Matter, Norman Ives, Bradbury Thompson, Anton Stankowski, Lisette Model, and Paul Rand.

When Yale's Graphic Design Department was established in 1951, photography was seen as an integral part of the curriculum. Twenty years later, with photography's increased presence in the arts, Eisenman and Hill founded Yale's first Department of Photography, making it independent from its parent, Graphic Design.

Hill served as the department's first Director of Graduate Studies in Photography from 1971 to 1978.

== Professional work ==
In more than twenty years of teaching, Hill continued to work as a photographer, taking pictures for numerous books, magazines, and corporate publications. As a designer, his work is diverse, ranging from US postage stamp design to exhibition installations. Within the last ten years he has focused primarily on books, exhibition design, and writing.

== Executor of the Walker Evans estate ==
Three years before his death, Walker Evans asked Hill to serve as executor of his estate. On Evans's death in 1975, Hill took as a goal the expanded reading of Evans's work. At the time, Evans's work was commonly perceived as, at best, a bathetic record of the Great Depression in the rural South. For Hill and many others, however, Evans's work rose above that limited appraisal, and deserved to be more closely examined as a more universal statement transcending the specifics of time and place. As executor, Hill produced four books for the Evans Estate. Others followed, all with that same purpose.

During and after his 19-year tenure as Evans's executor, Hill created exhibitions of gelatin silver prints made from Evans's negatives. Within the last ten years, Hill has used digital techniques and printing to interpret Evans's images. These digital tools allow maintaining detailed information in both dark and light passages, in a manner not possible with gelatin silver printing. Hill has used these digital techniques to produce prints, exhibitions, and books that extend the appreciation of Evans's intricate and multi-layered work. These exhibitions have been shown in museums and galleries in France, Germany, Italy, Switzerland, Korea, New York City, Vancouver, and numerous other institutions worldwide.

With Hill's help, the Evans archive was acquired by the Metropolitan Museum of Art in 1994. There it has received appreciation for its intrinsic value as the work of one of America's seminal artists. Proper conservation and cataloging can only be realized by an institution with such perception, size, and depth. The major portion of that archive is now available for study online.

== Writings and Publications ==
Hill has also produced books presenting the work of wide-ranging talents, including Walker Evans, W. Eugene Smith, Edward Weston, Erwin Hauer, and Peter Sekaer.

In 2013 Hill designed the book Calder by Matter for Cahiers d'Art. It is Herbert Matter's intimate account of Calder's work and his family life over thirty years.

Books related to Walker Evans produced by J.T. Hill:

- Walker Evans: First and Last
- Walker Evans at Work
- Walker Evans: Havana
- Walker Evans: The Hungry Eye
- Walker Evans: Lyric Documentary
- Walker Evans: Depth of Field

== Books designed, edited, authored, co-authored, or produced by Hill ==
- The Eye of Walker Evans. Lucy Sante. On the occasion of the exhibition Walker Evans: New York (Los Angeles, J. Paul Getty Museum, 28 July-11 Oct 1998). Broadly surveys the life and work of Evans.
- Walker Evans: First and Last. Harper and Row, New York, 1978. Seker Warburg, London, 1978. Design, picture sequence, and production by Hill.
- Walker Evans at Work. Harper and Row, New York, 1982. Thames and Hudson, London, 1982. Essay, Jerry L. Thompson. Concept, design, and picture editing, Hill
- Walker Evans Havana 1933. Contrejour, Paris, 1989. Pantheon, New York, 1989. Concept, design and picture editing, Hill with Carla Miller.
- Walker Evans: The Hungry Eye. Co-authors, Hill, Gilles Mora. Les Editions du Seuil, Paris, 1993 Harry N. Abrams. New York, 1993. Winner of the Prix de Nadar, Paris. The Krasna Krausz Book Award, London. Design Judy Kohn, concept and supervision Hill.
- W. Eugene Smith Photographs 1934-1975. Co-authors, Hill, Gilles Mora, Editions Le Seuil, Paris, 1988. Harry N. Abrams. New York, 1988, Thames and Hudson, London, 1988, Design and picture editing, Hill and Dorothy O'Connor Hill.
- Walker Evans Simple Secrets. High Museum of Art. Harry N. Abrams. New York, 1998. Design, picture editing, and production, Hill. Honored by the AIGA as one of 50 Books of the Year.
- Walker Evans: Depth of Field. Co-authors, Hill and Heinz Liesbrock. Design, Hill. Prestel, Munich, 2015.
- Edward Weston: Forms of Passion, Passion of Forms. Seuil, Paris, 1998. Harry N. Abrams. New York, 1998. Thames and Hudson, London, 1998. Design and picture editing, Hill and Dorothy Hill.
- Walker Evans. Biography by James Mellow. HillBasic, New York, 1999. Design, picture editing, Hill and Dorothy Hill. Honored by the AIGA as one of 50 Books of the Year.
- The Idea of Cuba: Alex Harris. University of New Mexico Press. In association with The Center of Documentary Studies. Duke University, 2003. Design, Hill.
- Herbert Matter Stanford University, 2005. On the occasion of the acquisition of the Matter Archive. Design, picture editing, separations, and production, Hill.
- Erwin Hauer: Continua. Architectural Screens and Walls. Princeton Architectural. New York, 2004. Design and picture editing, Hill.
- Walker Evans: Lyric Documentary. Author and picture editor, Hill. Steidl, Göttingen, Germany, 2007. Book design, and digital separations, Hill.
- Walker Evans American Photographs. Books on Books. Errata, New York, 2008. Primary essay, "The Legacy of Seeing," Hill.
- Peter Sekaer: Signs of Life. Author and picture editor, Hill. Steidl, Göttingen, Germany, 2010. Book design, and digital separations, Hill.
- Calder by Matter. Essays by Jed Perl and Hill. Cahiers d'Art, Paris, 2013. Book design, separations, and printing supervision, Hill.
- May Day at Yale, Recollections 1970 Co-authors, Henry Chauncey, Thomas Strong, and Hill. 2015.
- Walker Evans: Labor Anonymous. Edited by Thomas Zander. Walther König, Cologne. Essays by David Campany, Heinz Liesbrock and Jerry L. Thompson.
- Random Access: Photographs by John T. Hill, edited by Corinne Forti, Steidl, 2022

== Exhibitions Produced By Hill ==
- The Work of Hebert Matter and Alvin Lustig, Hill created the first exhibition featuring their work in the University of Georgia's art school gallery, 1954
- Lincoln's America, USIA Exhibition. Hill was part of a small team of students and faculty who created the exhibition over a Christmas Holiday in 1958 and early 59. Faculty advisors were Alvin Eisenman, Norman Ives, and Bradbury Thompson, 1958
- Photographs by Hebert Matter, with work by Herbert Matter, Foto Festival, Arles, France, 2000
- Photographs by Peter Sekaer, with work by Peter Sekaer, Foto Festival, Arles, France, 2002
- Walker Evans: Carbon and Silver, produced by Hill and Sven Martson, Evans' centennial exhibition, Yale University Art School Gallery, 2003; Harvard University, 2003; Duke University, 2003; Museo di Roma, Palazzo Brachi, 2005–06; UBS Gallery and Yale School of Art Avenue of Americas, 2006; Museo Alinari, Piazza S.M. Novella, Firenze, Italy, 2007.
- Walker Evans: New Translations and Vintage Prints, Galerie Thomas Zander, Cologne, Germany, 2004
- Norman Ives: Constructions & Reconstructions, American Institute of Graphic Arts, New York City, 2007
- Walker Evans: Carbon and Silver, Fenimore Art Museum, Cooperstown, New York, 2009
- The Exacting Eye of Walker Evans, Florence Griswold Museum, 2011/12
- Walker Evans's "Havana 1933", Laguardia Community College, 2013
- The Art of Walker Evans, Sandra Naddaff and Leigh Hafrey Three Columns Gallery, 2014
- Walker Evans: Depth of Field, accompanied by the book of the same name, Josef Albers Museum, curated by its Director, Dr. Heinz Liesbrock, Bottrop, Germany, 2015/16 – most comprehensive exhibition to date, with over 300 items including 30 signed prints
- Walker Evans: Depth of Field, Vancouver Art Gallery, 2016
- Norman Ives: Constructions & Reconstructions, Rochester Institute of Technology, 2016/17
- Norman Ives: Constructions & Reconstructions, UMASS North Dartmouth, 2021

== Exhibitions of work by Hill ==
- Four Directions in Modern Photography, Yale University Art Gallery, 1973
- Bulldog and Panther Exhibition, Yale University Art Gallery, 2014
- John T. Hill: Persistent Observer, The Institute Library (New Haven), 2021/22
- Random Access: Photographs by John T. Hill, Lyman Allyn Art Museum, New London, CT, 2023

== Museum collections ==
- International Center for Photography: 4 prints)
- Yale Art Gallery: 1 print)
- Bibliothèque Nationale
- MoMA, Study Collection
- Black Mountain College
- Josef and Annie Albers Foundation Collection
- Josef Albers Museum, Bottrop, Germany
