= Sweet Nothin's =

Single by Brenda Lee

from the album Brenda Lee
- B-side: "Weep No More My Baby"
- Released: 28 September 1959
- Recorded: 13 August 1959
- Studio: Bradley Studios, Nashville, Tennessee
- Genre: Rockabilly; teen pop; country
- Length: 2:23
- Label: Decca 30967
- Songwriter: Ronnie Self
- Producer: Owen Bradley

Brenda Lee singles chronology
"Let's Jump the Broomstick" (1959)	"Sweet Nothin's" (1959)	"That's All You Gotta Do" (1960)

Sweet Nothin's is a 1959 song by Brenda Lee written by Ronnie Self. It peaked at No. 4 on the Billboard Hot 100 and No. 12 on the Hot R&B Sides chart, in 1960. The song (as Sweet Nuthin's) also charted on the UK Singles Chart in 1960, peaking at No. 4, marking Lee's first appearance on the UK chart.

The track begins with the sound of a whispering man who is speaking in a gibberish voice, where only Brenda Lee could understand, before the singing begins. Several radio stations banned the whispering dialogue as being too risque for airplay.

Musician and producer David Z adapted Lee's vocals from the song to produce the distinctive backing vocals in "Kiss", the smash hit for Prince. Lee's voice from "Sweet Nothin's" was later sampled in Kanye West's song "Bound 2" on his 2013 album Yeezus. This sample in turn was used by Sigma in their 2014 song "Nobody to Love."

== In popular culture ==
The song was used in a 1985 TV commercial for Molson Canadian beer in Canada.
