= So Long, Mother =

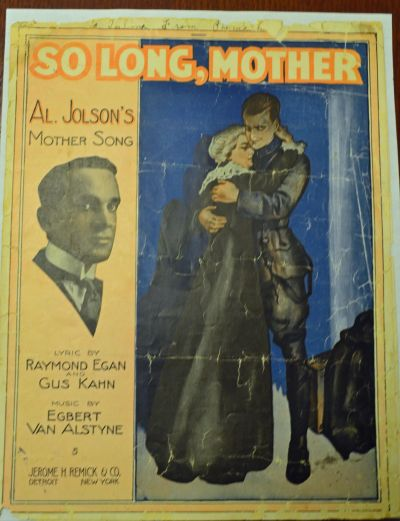

Song
- Released: 1917
- Composer(s): Egbert Van Alstyne
- Lyricist(s): Raymond B. Egan, Gus Kahn

"So Long, Mother" is a World War I era song released in 1917. Raymond B. Egan and Gus Kahn wrote the lyrics. Egbert Van Alstyne composed the music. The song was published by Jerome H. Remick & Co. of Detroit, Michigan. On the cover is a soldier and mother in an embrace. Adjacent is an inset photo of singer Al Jolson. It was written for both voice and piano.

The song is told from the soldier's point of view as he comforts his heavyhearted mother before he leaves for war. The chorus is as follows:

So long my dear old lady
Don't you cry
Just kiss your grown-up baby goodbye
Somewhere in France I'll be dreaming of you
You and your dear eyes of blue
Come let me see you smile before we part
I'll throw a kiss to cheer your dear old heart
Dry the tear in your eye
Don't you sigh
Don't you cry
So long, mother
Kiss your boy goody-bye

The sheet music can be found at Pritzker Military Museum & Library.
