= Pretty Baby (Tony Jackson song) =

Song written by Tony Jackson

Single by Billy Murray
- B-side: "When You Drop Off at Cairo, Illinois"
- Published: 1916
- Released: September 1916
- Recorded: June 22, 1916
- Genre: Traditional pop
- Label: Victor
- Composers: Tony Jackson, Egbert Van Alstyne
- Lyricist: Gus Kahn

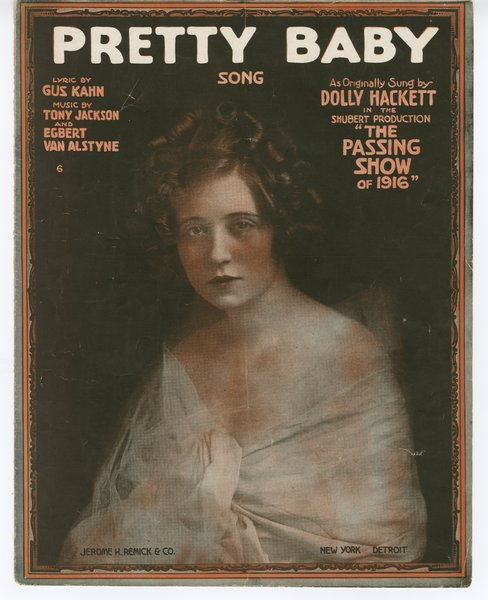
Sheet music cover, 1916

"Pretty Baby" is a song written by Tony Jackson during the Ragtime era. The song was remembered as being prominent in Jackson's repertory before he left New Orleans in 1912, but was not published until 1916.

The background as to how the song came to be published has been confused over the years. However, it appears that composer Egbert Van Alstyne and lyricist Gus Kahn were writing partners. Whilst Van Alstyne was Chicago manager of music publishers Jerome H. Remick & Company, they heard Tony Jackson singing the song one evening at a Chicago nightspot. Van Alstyne and Kahn liked the melody, but felt the lyrics were unsuitable for mass consumption. This resulted in Jackson being paid $250 for the rights to the tune, and Kahn re-writing the lyrics, with Van Alstyne adding a verse, which he took from one of his earlier unsuccessful songs. Jackson's name was included on the sheet music.

The song was quickly interpolated into the Broadway show A World of Pleasure (which ran from October 14, 1915 to January 22, 1916), and was then used in the show The Passing Show of 1916 (June 22 – October 21, 1916), in which it was sung by Dolly Hackett. In London, the song was included in the musical Houp La!, which opened on November 23, 1916. In this show, it was sung by Gertie Millar.

Billy Murray recorded the song on June 22, 1916 for Victor Records (catalog 18102), and it was a success for him.

== Other notable recordings ==
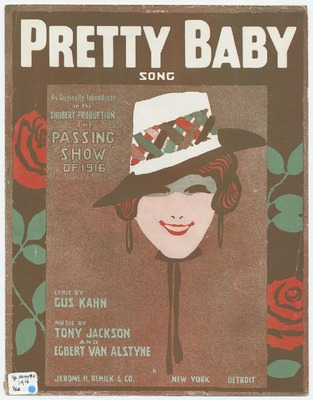
Alternate sheet music cover, 1916

- 1930 - The Louisiana Rhythm Kings recorded the song on January 27, 1930 as part of a series of hot instrumental versions of older songs by this Brunswick studio group, usually with Red Nichols as director.
- 1947 - Bing Crosby recorded it on December 3, 1947 with John Scott Trotter and His Orchestra.
- 1948 - Doris Day
- 1949 - Al Jolson recorded it on May 17, 1949 for Decca Records.
- 1957 - Dean Martin included the song on his album Pretty Baby.
- 1960 - Brenda Lee recorded it for her album Grandma, What Great Songs You Sang!.
- 1966 - Eddie Fisher included the song on his album I Love You.

== Film appearances ==
- 1929 - Is Everybody Happy?
- 1930 - Mammy, sung by Al Jolson.
- 1935 - Ruggles of Red Gap. It was sung in a skit by Leila Hyams (with Roland Young on the drums).
- 1939 - Rose of Washington Square, performed by Al Jolson
- 1942 - Roxie Hart. Arranged by Alfred Newman, performed over a montage of newspaper headlines.
- 1943 - Coney Island, performed by Betty Grable, Harry Masters and male quartet.
- 1944 - Broadway Rhythm, sung by Kenny Bowers, Gloria DeHaven, and Charles Winninger.
- 1948 - Sitting Pretty, sung by a chorus during the opening credits and at the end.
- 1948 - The Stork Market (Screen Songs), sung by a chorus, musical arrangements by Winston Sharples.
- 1949 - Jolson Sings Again, sung by Al Jolson.
- 1950 - Young Man with a Horn, played during the scene with the hula dancer.
- 1950 - Pretty Baby, arranged by David Buttolph, played over the opening credits and throughout.
- 1951 - I'll See You in My Dreams, sung by Danny Thomas and played often throughout the picture.
- 1953 - The Eddie Cantor Story, sung by Eddie in the Midnight Frolics.
- 1978 - Pretty Baby, performed by Antonio Fargas and also played when the kids are in the barn.

== In popular culture ==
The Warner Brothers comedy Pretty Baby (1950), with Dennis Morgan and Betsy Drake, takes its title from this song. So does the Louis Malle film (with an entirely different storyline and characters) released in 1978, with Brooke Shields and Susan Sarandon.

In a 2008 episode of the British soap opera EastEnders, veteran character Dot Branning had the show's first monologue episode. During the programme, Dot recalls her wartime experiences as a child, in which her beloved uncle would sing to her. She sings "Pretty Baby" into the tape recorder (for her sick husband, Jim Branning). The episode ends with Al Jolson's recording of the song.

The video game Dark Fall: Lost Souls features a clip of the song playing on a tabletop radio near the hotel lobby.

== Lyrics ==
Billy Murray's 1916 recording has lyrics as follows:

Verse 1

You ask me why I'm always teasing you.
You hate to have me call you "Pretty Baby."
I really thought that I was pleasing you,
For you're just a baby to me.

Your cunning little dimples and your baby stare,
Your baby talk and baby walk and curly hair,
Your baby smile
Makes life worthwhile.
You're just as sweet as you can be.

Verse 2

Your mother said you were the cutest kid.
No wonder, Dearie, that I'm wild about you
And all the cunning things you said and did.
Why, I love to fondly recall.

And just like Peter Pan it seems you'll always be
The same sweet cunning little baby dear to me,
And that is why
I'm sure that I
Will always love you best of all.

Chorus

Everybody loves a baby that's why I'm in love with you,
Pretty baby, pretty baby,
And I'd like to be your sister, brother, dad and mother too,
Pretty baby, pretty baby.

Won't you come and let me rock you in my cradle of love
And we'll cuddle all the time.
Oh, I want a lovin' baby, and it might as well be you,
Pretty baby of mine,
Pretty baby of mine.
