= Give a Little Credit to the Navy =

Song
- Language: English
- Published: 1918
- Composer(s): Albert Gumble
- Lyricist(s): Buddy DeSylva & Gus Kahn

"Give a Little Credit to the Navy" is a World War I song written by Buddy DeSylva & Gus Kahn and composed by Albert Gumble. This song was published in 1918 by Jerome H. Remick & Co., in Detroit, MI.

The sheet music cover, illustrated by Starmer, features photos of Commander William Buel Frankling, USNRF, Del Chain and Sidney Phillips, with ships in the background.

The sheet music can be found at the Pritzker Military Museum & Library.
