= That's All You Gotta Do =

Single by Brenda Lee

from the album Brenda Lee
- B-side: "I'm Sorry"
- Released: 30 May 1960
- Recorded: 27 March 1960
- Studio: Bradley Studios (Nashville, Tennessee)
- Genre: Rockabilly
- Length: 2:27
- Label: Decca Records 31093
- Songwriter: Jerry Reed
- Producer: Owen Bradley

Brenda Lee singles chronology
"Sweet Nothin's" (1959)	"That's All You Gotta Do" (1960)	"I Want to Be Wanted" (1960)

"That's All You Gotta Do" is a song written by Jerry Reed and performed by Brenda Lee. It peaked at #6 on the Billboard Hot 100 the week of July 18, 1960, with another Lee hit song "I'm Sorry" simultaneously occupying the top spot. It also reached #19 on the R&B chart in 1960. The song also reached #6 in Australia. The song was featured on her 1960 album, Brenda Lee.

The song was ranked #71 on Billboard magazine's Top Hot 100 songs of 1960.
