= Let's Jump the Broomstick =

Single by Brenda Lee

from the album Brenda Lee
- B-side: "Some of These Days"
- Released: 27 April 1959
- Recorded: 11 October 1958
- Studio: Bradley Studios (Nashville, Tennessee)
- Genre: Rockabilly; novelty
- Length: 2:25
- Label: Decca 30885
- Songwriter(s): Charles Robins
- Producer(s): Owen Bradley

Brenda Lee singles chronology
"Bill Bailey Won't You Please Come Home" (1958)	"Let's Jump the Broomstick" (1959)	"Sweet Nothin's" (1959)

"Let's Jump the Broomstick" is a song written by Charles Robins and performed first by a black Nashville group, Alvin Gaines & The Themes, in 1959, then covered that year by Brenda Lee. Her version reached No.12 in the United Kingdom in 1961. The song was featured on her 1960 album, Brenda Lee. The song is based on the popular custom and phrase jumping the broom.

The song was arranged by Owen Bradley.

== Other versions ==
- Sandy Denny released a version on her 1971 album, The North Star Grassman and the Ravens.
- Coast to Coast released a version of the song as a single in the UK in 1981. It reached No. 28 on the UK Singles Chart.

== In media ==
- The song was used for a lyp-synch contest on the October 4, 1963 episode of Ready Steady Go! (the first appearance of The Beatles - who had once been Brenda Lee's opening act on a UK tour), judged by Paul McCartney, who chose 13-year-old Melanie Coe as the winner; a few years later, after Coe ran off with a boyfriend, her disappearance made the front page of the Daily Mirror, which would serve as McCartney's inspiration for "She's Leaving Home".
