= What Are You Going to Do to Help the Boys? =

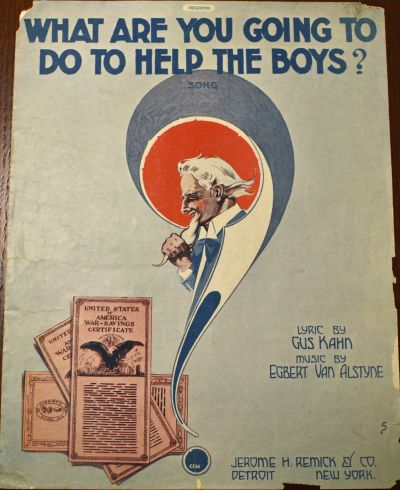

Song
- Released: 1918
- Label: Jerome H. Remick & Co.
- Composer(s): Egbert Van Alstyne
- Lyricist(s): Gus Kahn

"What Are You Going to Do to Help the Boys?" is a World War I era song released in 1918. Gus Kahn wrote the lyrics. Egbert Van Alstyne composed the music. It was published by Jerome H. Remick & Co. of Detroit, Michigan. Artist E.E. Walton designed the sheet music cover. It features Uncle Sam inside a red, white, and blue question mark. He is holding his beard and looking down at liberty bonds. To the left of this image it reads, "Buy a Liberty Bond!" on some editions. The song was written for both piano and voice.

The song is a call to action. It encourages listeners to buy liberty bonds, especially if they are staying home while soldiers fight overseas. The voice states that it doesn't matter one's age, where he is from, or who he is. Uncle Sam expects everyone to help in the war effort. The chorus is as follows:

What are you going to do for Uncle Sammy?
What are you going to do to help the boys?
If you mean to stay at home
While they're fighting o'er the foam
The least you can do is buy a Liberty bond or two
If you're going to be a sympathetic miser
The kind that only lends noise
You're no better than the one who loves the Kaiser
So what are you going to do to help the boys?

The sheet music can be found at Pritzker Military Museum & Library.
