= Memories (1915 song) =

1915 popular song

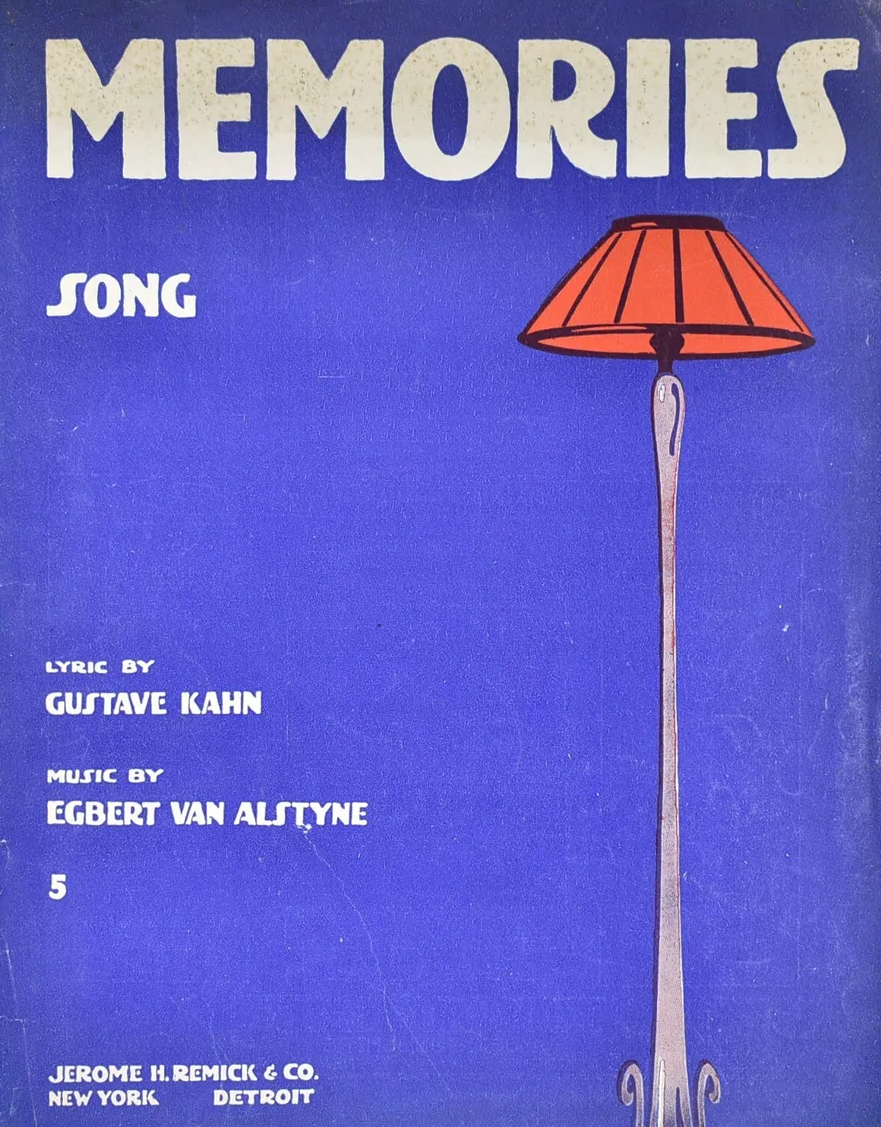
Sheet music cover, 1915

"Memories" is a popular song with music by Egbert Van Alstyne and lyrics by Gus Kahn, published in 1915.

The song has become a pop standard, recorded by many people over the years. Early successes were by Henry Burr who recorded the song in December 1915 using the name of Harry McClaskey, and by John Barnes Wells who recorded it for Victor Records (catalog 17968A) on February 3, 1916.

== Other notable recordings ==
- Pat Boone covered the song on his album Memories (1966).
- Bing Crosby recorded the song on November 27, 1947 with John Scott Trotter and His Orchestra.
- It was sung by Mario Lanza on his 1952 Coca-Cola Radio Show.
- "Mitch Miller & The Gang" on their 1959 album, "Still More Sing Along with Mitch".
- George Morgan – included in his album Golden Memories (1961).
- Progressive rock group Phish encored with this song 47 times throughout their illustrious career, often without the use of microphones to keep it in traditional settings.

== Film appearances ==
- 1940 The motion picture "It All Came True" featured a version by the Lady Killers Quartet.
- 1944 The Old Grey Hare - Briefly sung by an elderly dying Bugs Bunny.
- 1950 Cheaper by the Dozen (1950 film) - Briefly sung by Frank (Clifton Webb) and his children.
- 1951 I'll See You in My Dreams - played on piano at the Townsend Publishing Co. Also sung on-stage by a male tenor
- 1953 So This Is Love

== Lyrics ==
(Egbert Van Alstyne / Gus Kahn)

Round me at twilight come stealing
Shadows of days that are gone
Dreams of the old days revealing
Mem'ries of love's golden dawn

Memories, memories
Dreams of love so true
O'er the sea of memory
I'm drifting back to you

Childhood days, wild wood days
Among the birds and bees
You left me alone, but still you're my own
In my beautiful memories

Sunlight may teach me forgetting
Noonlight brings thoughts that are new
Twilight brings sighs and regretting
Moonlight means sweet dreams of you

Memories, memories
Dreams of love so true
O'er the sea of memory
I'm drifting back to you

Childhood days, wild wood days
Among the birds and bees
You left me alone, but still you're my own
In my beautiful memories
