= For Your Boy and My Boy =

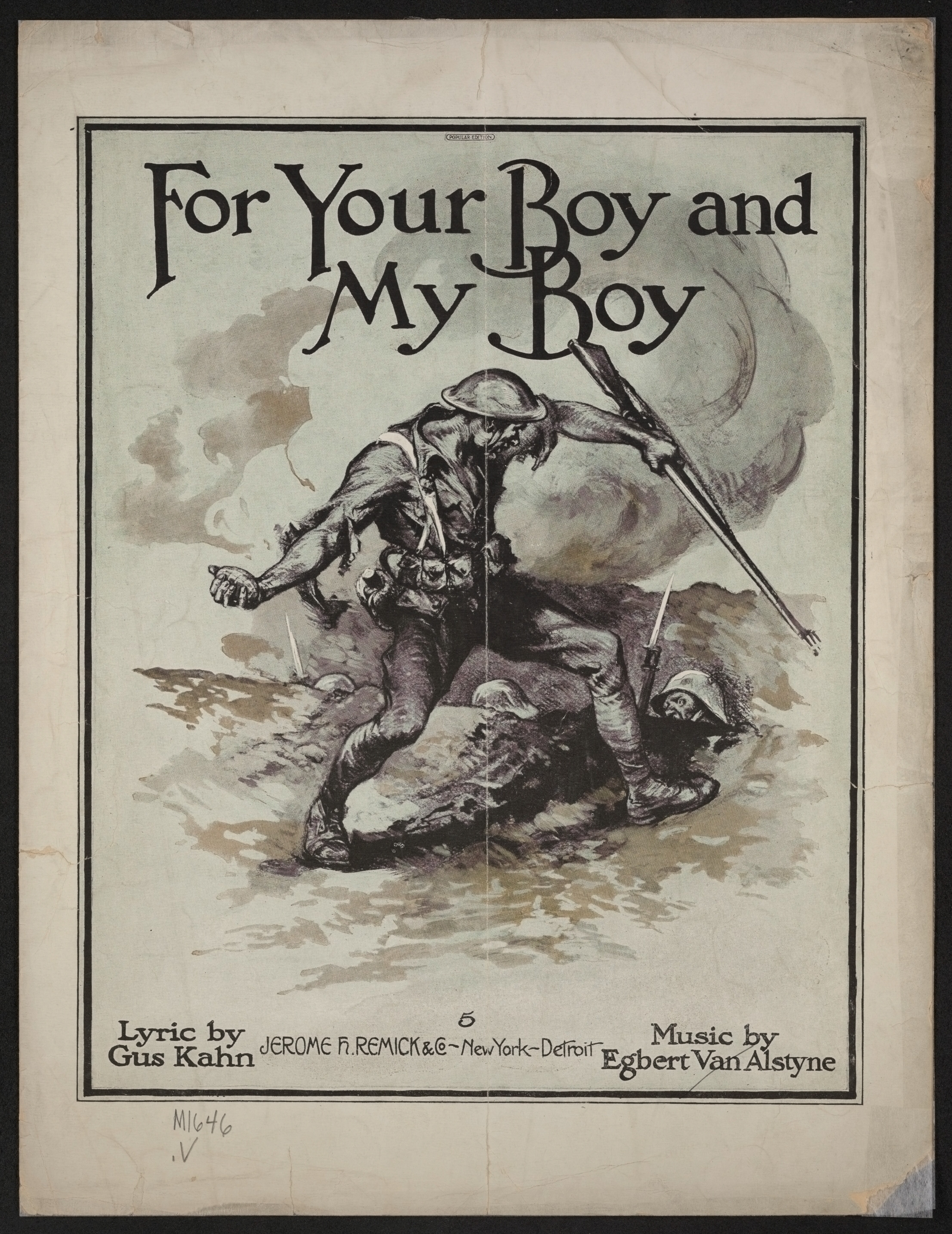
- Sheet music cover

Song
- Written: 1918
- Composer: Egbert Van Alstyne
- Lyricist: Gus Kahn

Alternative sheet music cover
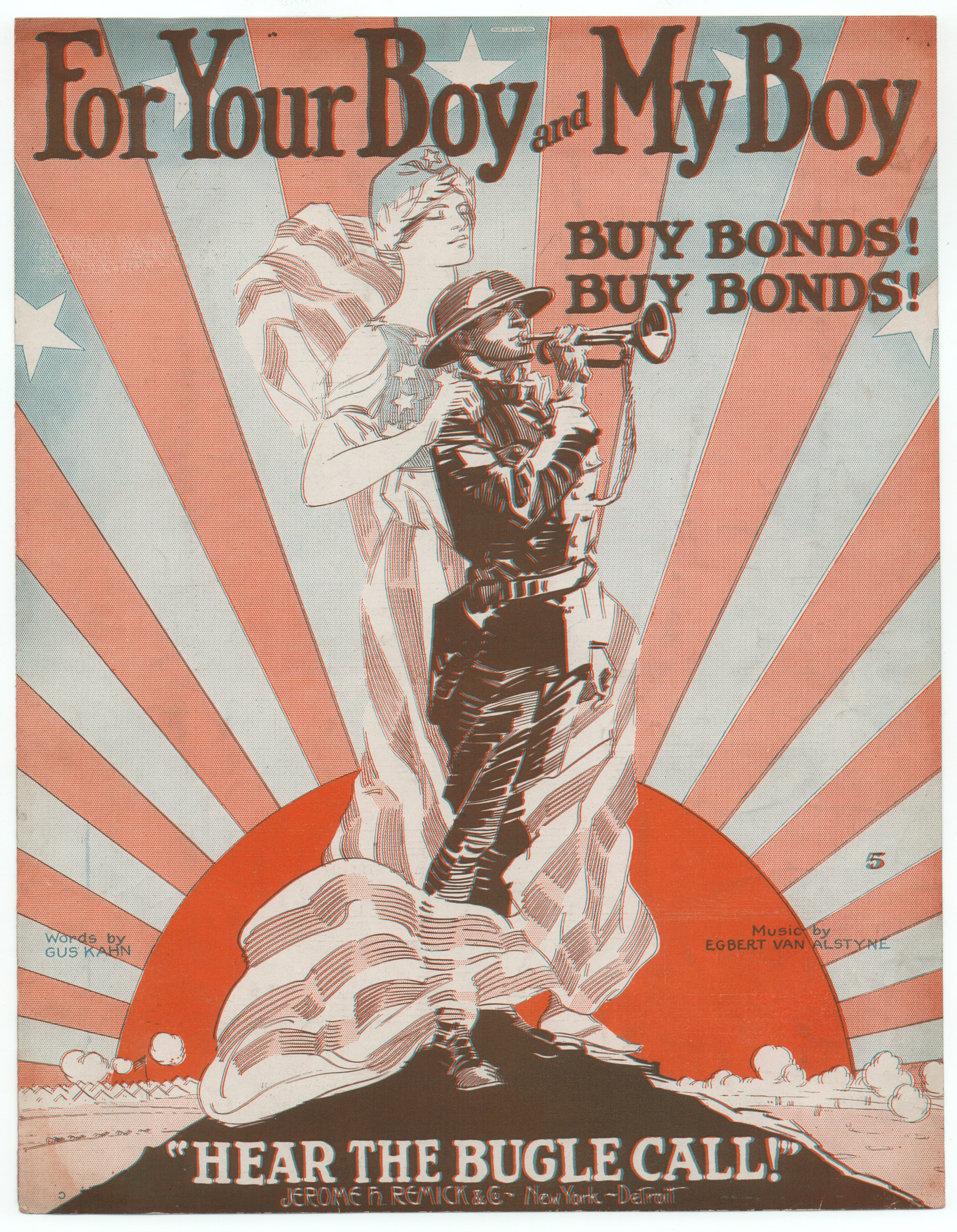

"For Your Boy and My Boy" is a 1918 song composed by Egbert Van Alstyne, with lyrics written by Gus Kahn and published by Jerome H. Remick & Co. The song was performed by Al Jolson and later reached No. 4 on the top 100 US songs of 1918 with a cover by the Peerless Quartet.

== Cover art and analysis ==
The cover illustration features a soldier carrying a bayonet, with a grenade in his hand standing near a German trench ready to throw the grenade at the German soldiers. A later cover features a soldier playing the bugle with "Lady Liberty" standing with her hands on his shoulders.

"For Your Boy and My Boy" was originally written for the Fourth Liberty Loan drive which looked to sell bonds in order to support the allied cause during World War I. It calls upon the patriotic duty of citizens to help out the soldiers overseas by buying bonds and funding the war effort. The chorus line "Ev'ry bond that we are buying will help the boys to cross the Rhine. Buy bonds, buy bonds, for your boy and mine," is repeated throughout the song to emphasize the importance of buying bonds.

The Music Trades said the melody is "particularly catchy and the words are such that they bring the meaning of the Liberty Loan drive right to the home, and bands will be blazing forth its melody from coast to coast."

== See also ==
- Liberty Bond
- Songs of World War I
