= Grace Leboy =

American composer and songwriter (1890-1983)

Grace Leboy Kahn (September 22, 1890 – May 24, 1983) was an American composer. A prolific songwriter, among her best known works are "I Wish I Had A Girl" (1908) and selections from the Jumping Jupiter musical.

== Life and career ==
Leboy was born in Brooklyn, New York to Samuel LeBoy (originally Lebovitch) and Celia Leboy (née Liborski), both Jewish immigrants. She grew up in Illinois and was the sixth of seven children.

Leboy was a precocious musician, gaining employment as a pianist by age 15, and fame by age 18 with her song "I Wish I Had A Girl". By age 21 she had songs on the Broadway stage in Jumping Jupiter. Notable performers of her day recorded her songs and compositions. Lyrics for many of her songs were written by Gus Kahn whom she married in 1916. They were the parents of Donald Gustave Kahn (July 17, 1918 – April 11, 2008) and Irene Kahn (1922–1985). Grace was played by Doris Day in I'll See You in My Dreams, a film that portrays the lives and times of Leboy and Kahn.

== Selected compositions ==
- Are You Lonesome 1909
- Bring Along Your Dancing Shoes 1915
- Dublin Bay 1912
- Early In The Morning (Down On The Farm) 1916
- Everybody Rag With Me 1914
- The Good Ship Mary Ann 1914
- Henry, oh Henry 1912
- I Wish I Had A Girl 1907
- I'm awfully afraid of girls 1910
- I'm on the jury 1913
- It all goes up in smoke 1910
- It's touch when Izzy Rosenstein loves Genevieve Malone 1910
- June, July and August 1909
- Just wond'ring : waltz song 1927
- Lazy Day 1932
- Love and Springtime 1914
- Make a noise like a hoop and roll away
- Moonlight on the Mississippi 1913
- Music vot's music must come from Berlin
- My heart keeps right on beating 1911
- Oh how that woman could cook 1914
- On the 5:15
- Pass The Pickles: Tango 1913
- Pretty soft for me 1909
- Roses at Dawning
- Say boys! I've found a girl 1909
- Soap-bubble Days 1910
- Think Of Me (I'll Be Thinking Of You)
- Those Olden Golden Days of Long Ago (lyrics by Daisy Sullivan) 1917
- To The Strains Of That Wedding March 1910
- 'Twas Only A Summer Night's Dream = Solo Fué Un Sueño En Noche De Verano 1932
- You and I Cupid 1910
- (You're always sure of) My love for you 1930
- Will you always call me honey 1908
- Will You Be Sorry? 1928
- What's the use of moonlight 1909
- When Jack Came Sailing Home Again 1911
