= The Emotions (doo-wop group) =

American doo-wop vocal group

- Also known as: The Runarounds, The Exterminators
- Origin: New York City, United States
- Genres: Doo-wop
- Years active: 1958–1970, 1982–present
- Labels: Kapp, Laurie, 20th Century Fox, Columbia
- Members: Joe Favale; George Winter; Vic Guzman; Carmine Laietta
- Past members: Tony Maltese; Dom Colurra; Larry Cusamano; Joe Nigro

The Emotions are an American doo-wop vocal group from New York City, United States.

The group was formed in 1958 by Joe Favale (lead vocal, b.1940), who had been singing with a group called The Moments, and Tony Maltese (tenor), who had another group, The Runarounds. They recruited singers Dom Colurra (bass), Larry Cusamano (second tenor) and Joe Nigro (baritone), and found a manager, Henry Boye. Initially calling themselves The Runarounds, they renamed themselves as The Emotions in 1959. In 1962, they won a contract with Kapp Records, and released "Echo", a song written by Favale but credited jointly to the group and Boye. The record was chosen as a "pick hit of the week" by leading DJ Murray the K, and rose to number 76 on the Billboard pop chart.

After further singles on Kapp and Laurie, the group signed for the 20th Century Fox label in 1963 and released their version of "A Story Untold", which became a regional hit. However, later recordings were less successful and, after a series of personnel changes but still fronted by Favale, the group finally broke up in 1970. Favale reformed the group with new personnel in 1982, and recorded an album for Columbia Records. The group continued to perform, with a line-up of Joe Favale, George Winter, Vic Guzman, and Carmine Laietta.

On the novelty song "The Beetle-Bomb," a song about the British Invasion of American Pop music, both Henry Boye and Joe Favale are credited, indicating that they were playing under the moniker "The Exterminators."

Original lead singer Joe Favale died in January 2024 at age 84.
