= I'm Sorry (Brenda Lee song) =

- Danish release picture sleeve

Single by Brenda Lee

from the album Brenda Lee
- A-side: "That's All You Gotta Do"
- Released: 16 May 1960
- Recorded: 28 March 1960
- Studio: Bradley Studios (Nashville, Tennessee)
- Genre: Countrypolitan
- Length: 2:40
- Label: Decca Records 9-31093
- Songwriters: Dub Allbritten, Ronnie Self
- Producer: Owen Bradley

Brenda Lee singles chronology
"Sweet Nothin's" (1959)	"I'm Sorry" (1960)	"I Want to Be Wanted" (1960)

"I'm Sorry" is a 1960 hit song by 15-year-old American singer Brenda Lee. The song was written by Dub Allbritten and Ronnie Self. It peaked at No. 1 on the Billboard Hot 100 singles chart in July 1960. On the UK Singles Chart, the song peaked at No.12. AllMusic guide wrote that it is the pop star's "definitive song", and one of the "finest teen pop songs of its era". In 1999, the 1960 recording by Lee on Decca Records was inducted into the Grammy Hall of Fame.

This song featured the Anita Kerr Singers doing the backup Chorus. It also featured Brenda Lee's spoken recitation during the first repeat of the Chorus.

== Background ==
According to the Billboard Book of Number One Hits by Fred Bronson, Brenda Lee recorded the song early in 1960, but her label, Decca Records, held it from release for several months out of concern that a 15-year-old girl was not mature enough to sing about unrequited love. When the song finally was released, it was considered to be the flip side of the more uptempo "That's All You Gotta Do". Although "That's All You Gotta Do" was a chart success in its own right, reaching No. 6 on the Hot 100, it was "I'm Sorry" that became the smash hit and the standard. On other charts, "I'm Sorry" peaked at number four on the R&B chart and "That's All You Gotta Do" peaked at number nineteen on the R&B charts.

"I'm Sorry" was released as the A-side (with "That's All You Gotta Do" as the B-side) when the single was released in the UK in July 1960. "I'm Sorry" was not one of Lee's more successful singles in the UK, where Lee's previous single, "Sweet Nothin's", and several later releases (notably "Speak to Me Pretty", "All Alone Am I" and "As Usual") were substantially bigger hits.

Although "I'm Sorry" was never released to country radio in the United States as a single, it would in time become accepted by American country fans as a standard of the genre. The song—a fixture on many "country oldies" programs—was an early example of the new "Nashville sound", a style that emphasized a stringed-instrumental sound and background vocals.

== Charts ==
=== Weekly charts ===
Chart (1960)	Peak position
Belgium (Ultratop 50 Flanders)	2
Belgium (Ultratop 50 Wallonia)	2
Canada (CHUM Hit Parade)	7
New Zealand (Lever Hit Parades)	1
Netherlands (Single Top 100)	14
UK Singles (Official Charts)	12
US Billboard Hot 100	1
US Hot R&B/Hip-Hop Songs (Billboard)	4
US Cash Box Top 100	1
West Germany (GfK)	25

=== All-time charts ===
Chart (1958-2018)	Position
US Billboard Hot 100	159

== Covers ==
A remake of "I'm Sorry" was a minor hit for Joey Heatherton in 1972 reaching No. 87 on the Billboard Hot 100. It was recorded as a track on The Joey Heatherton Album. on July 26, 1972, and issued that November as the second single to the follow-up to Heatherton's sole Top 40 hit "Gone".

"I'm Sorry" has also been recorded by Bobby Vee (album Bobby Vee Sings Your Favorites/ 1960), Jane Morgan (album In My Style/ 1965), Dottie West (album Feminine Fancy/ 1968), Allison Durbin (album Are You Lonesome Tonight/ 1977), Billy Joe Royal (album Billy Joe Royal/ 1980) and Roch Voisine (album AmerIIcana/ 2009). A recording by Pat Boone made in 1960 was first released on the 2006 Pat Boone box set The Sixties 1960-1962.

A Czech-language rendering of "I'm Sorry", titled "Roň Slzy", was recorded in 1965 by Yvonne Přenosilová, who also performed the song in English as well during live performances. There is also a lesser known version by Helena Vondráčková. "I'm Sorry" has since been rendered in Danish as "Jeg be'r dig" recorded by Birthe Kjær on her 1974 album Tennessee Waltz and in Flemish as "Vergeef me" recorded by Mieke (album Horen zien en zingen/ 1978).

Alvin and the Chipmunks covered the song for their TV series episode "The Secret Life of Dave Seville".

== See also ==
- List of Billboard Hot 100 number-one singles of 1960
