= Peter Sekaer =

Danish photographer and artist

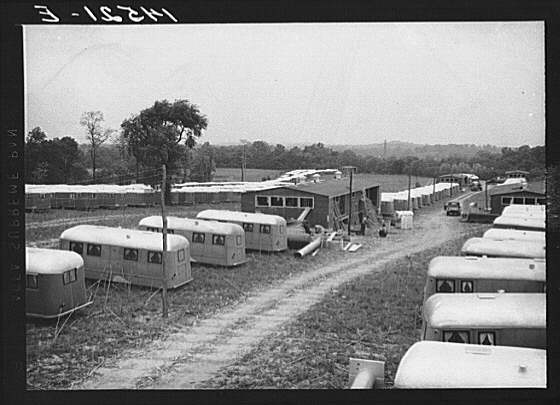
Peter Sekaer, Trailers for defense workers at Vultee Aircraft Plant. Nashville, Tennessee, 1941

Peter Sekaer (born Peter Ingemann Sekjær; 1901 – 14 July 1950) was a Danish photographer and artist.

== Biography ==
Born in Copenhagen, Denmark, Sekaer came to New York in 1918 to seek freedom and opportunity. By 1922 he had a reputation as a master sign painter and had his own successful business producing posters. Several years later he began to take classes at The Art Student's League. Sekaer soon became acquainted with Ben Shahn, who may have been the one to introduce him to photography and who later introduced him to Walker Evans. After 1933, he devoted himself exclusively to photography, studying with Berenice Abbott at the New School for Social Research, and assisting Walker Evans on the project of photographing The Museum of Modern Art's African sculpture collection.

In 1936 Sekaer accompanied Evans, who was hired by the Resettlement Administration (RA, later to become the FSA) on a photographic journey throughout the South, often shooting the same subject. Like many of his contemporaries, Sekaer sought to capture the real world with photographs that combined artistic expression with a personal commitment to social change.

From 1936 to 1942 Sekaer became a professional photographer and was hired by the federal government agency, the Rural Electrification Administration (REA), and later became the head of the REA's graphic department. In 1938 the REA sent Sekaer to the United States Housing Authority (USHA). The photographs Sekaer made for the USHA, an agency primarily concerned with the removal of city slums and sponsorship of public urban housing, reveal his continued interest in the richness of human experience and environment. Transferred again in 1940 Sekaer photographed Navajo and Pueblo Indians for the Office of Indian Affairs. That same year, he worked as photographic researcher and still photographer for the REA film Power and the Land.

After 1942 he continued working for other federal agencies photographing briefly for the Office of War Information (OWI), and the American Red Cross-agencies whose agendas conflicted with his own, and limited his freedom in artistic expression. Continually frustrated by this, Sekaer left Washington, DC for New York where he freelanced for several years, doing fashion and editorial assignments, until he died of a heart attack at the age of 49 in 1950.

== Work ==
Although Sekaer's photographs were widely published and exhibited during his lifetime, his work largely became forgotten after his death until an exhibition held in 1980 at the Witkin Gallery in New York and later in 1990 at the Royal Library in Copenhagen for which a catalogue was published. Many of Sekaer's photographic prints can be seen in the public collection of the Royal Library in Copenhagen.

The High Museum of Art in Atlanta acquired a trove of more than seventy rare vintage prints by Sekaer, the largest holding of its kind in any American art museum. Many of these works have never been on public view. From June 2010 until January 2011, the museum staged an exhibition of Sekaer's work titled "Signs of Life."

== Publications ==
Annemette Sørensen: Peter Sekaer, 1990, ISBN 87-7023-550-3, hft, Museum Tusculanum ( Danish)
