= Dub Allbritten =

American talent manager and music promoter

William Dumas "Dub" Allbritten Jr. (December 26, 1916 – March 19, 1971) was an American talent manager, music promoter, and executive based in Nashville, Tennessee. Operating through his entertainment complex, One-Niters, Inc., he is best known for launching and directing the international career of Brenda Lee, discovering rockabilly musician Ronnie Self, and managing country music stars Red Foley and Bobby Lord during the mid-20th century.

== Career ==
Albritten initially worked as the manager for country music artist Red Foley. In 1955, Albritten met unsigned singer-songwriter, Ronnie Self, and arranged his first recording session in April 1956 backed by the Nashville A-Team and released on ABC-Paramount Records in June 1956.

In March 1956, he discovered an 11-year-old Brenda Lee and booked her onto Foley's nationally broadcast ABC-TV series, Ozark Jubilee. Recognizing her potential, Albritten negotiated her recording contract with Decca Records and became her official personal manager in 1957, a role he maintained until his death.

As a manager, Albritten was known for aggressive and creative promotion. When booking a young Brenda Lee on international tours, he famously created a publicity stunt by starting a rumor with European promoters that Lee was actually a 32-year-old midget, ensuring mass media coverage and curiosity.

=== One-Niters, Inc. and expansion ===
Albritten established his independent talent corporation, One-Niters, Inc., which became a major hub for managing, booking, and promoting regional and national package tours. In March 1964, Albritten orchestrated a major international expansion by finalizing a global talent amalgamation between One-Niters, Inc. and London-based Don Arden Enterprises Ltd. The resulting joint venture, Anglo-American Artists, fused their management rosters to cross-promote British acts in the United States and Nashville country artists throughout Europe.

In 1970, he also signed the Canadian group The Poppy Family to a management contract just as they achieved international chart success.

== Death and legacy ==
Albritten died unexpectedly in 1971. Following his death, his partner and booking agent, Grover "Shorty" Lavender, took over the management operations of One-Niters, Inc., which later evolved into the Lavender-Blake Agency. Albritten's sudden passing deeply destabilized the career trajectory of his discovery Ronnie Self, who subsequently experienced major personal deterioration.
