= Emotions (Brenda Lee song) =

Single by Brenda Lee

from the album Emotions
- B-side: "I'm Learning About Love"
- Released: December 1960
- Recorded: August 16, 1960
- Studio: Bradley Studios, Nashville, Tennessee
- Genre: Country
- Length: 2:47
- Label: Decca Records 31195
- Songwriters: Ramsey Kearney, Mel Tillis
- Producer: Owen Bradley

Brenda Lee singles chronology
"I Want to Be Wanted" (1960)	"Emotions" (1960)	"You Can Depend on Me" (1961)

"Emotions" is a song written by Ramsey Kearney and Mel Tillis which became a Top Ten hit for Brenda Lee in 1961.

The original version of "Emotions" was a solo composition by Ramsey Kearney: in 1957 Kearney recorded a demo of the song with which he approached the Nashville music publishers where Mel Tillis was a staff writer. Tillis would recall: "I really liked the song and I told him...'You know, I think that I can get the song recorded by Carl Smith.'" Carl Smith did indeed record the song with the track serving as B-side to his #2 C&W hit "Why, Why".

In the summer of 1960 Tillis amended the lyrics to Kearney's original lyric for "Emotions" and successfully pitched the song for Brenda Lee to record. Lee recorded "Emotions" in an August 16, 1960 session at Bradley Film and Recording Studio in Nashville, Tennessee: the session - produced and arranged by Owen Bradley and featuring Floyd Cramer on piano - also produced Lee's #1 hit "I Want to Be Wanted" which was the precedent single to "Emotions". With the B-side "I'm Learning About Love" - recorded with the same personnel at an August 19, 1960 session at Bradley Film & Recording Studio - "Emotions" was issued as a single in December 1960 and rose to a #7 peak in February 1961. "I'm Learning About Love" also became a Top 40 hit for Lee peaking at #33.

A major hit in Australia (#20) and Flemish Belgium (#6), "Emotions" also afforded Lee a lower chart item in France (#56), Germany (#47), and the UK (#45).

An Emotions album by Brenda Lee - featuring both the title cut and "I'm Learning About Love" - was issued April 3, 1961.

== Other versions ==
- 1957 Carl Smith as the B-side to his #2 C&W "Why, Why" (original solo composition by Ramsey Kearney)
- 1984 Sami Jo Cole: single released in January and then withdrawn
- 1987 Juice Newton on her album Emotion
- 2002 Pam Tillis on her album It's All Relative: Tillis Sings Tillis
