= I Want to Be Wanted =

Single by Brenda Lee

from the album This Is...Brenda
- B-side: "Just A Little"
- Released: July 1960
- Recorded: March 27, 1960
- Studio: Bradley Studios (Nashville, Tennessee)
- Genre: Orchestral pop
- Length: 3:05
- Label: Decca Records
- Songwriters: Kim Gannon; Pino Spotti; Alberto Testa
- Producer: Owen Bradley

Brenda Lee singles chronology
"That's All You Gotta Do" (1960)	"I Want to Be Wanted" (1960)	"Emotions" (1961)

"I Want to Be Wanted" is a popular song performed by Brenda Lee.

== Background ==
It is an Italian song, Per tutta la vita (For all lifetime), written by Pino Spotti and Alberto Testa, In 1959 it was one of the 20 songs performed (in Italian) at the annual song contest in Italy called the "Festival di Sanremo," where each song was sung by 2 different singers. Wilma De Angelis and Jula de Palma were the singers for "Per tutta la vita," but the song did not place among the Festival's top ten. The performances of the Festival's songs were aired live January 29-31 on Italian Radio and TV. Later, the song was in the original version of Never on Sunday. The English lyrics of "I Want to Be Wanted" were written by Kim Gannon. Brenda Lee's English version of the song was issued in Italy on the Fonit label.

== Chart performance ==
"I Want to Be Wanted" was a number-one song in the United States during the year 1960. It topped the Billboard Hot 100 singles chart for the issue dated October 24, 1960, and remained there for one week. This was Brenda Lee's second number-one single, her first being "I'm Sorry", and was her most recent Billboard Hot 100 number-one for 63 years, until the week of December 9, 2023 when her Christmas single "Rockin' Around the Christmas Tree" reached number one, setting the longest period between number one singles by an artist.

In the UK, the song went to number thirty-one.

== Cover versions ==
- Andy Williams released a version as the B-side to his single "Stranger on the Shore".
- The song was covered by Olivia Newton-John on her 1992 album Back to Basics: The Essential Collection 1971–1992.

== See also ==
- List of Hot 100 number-one singles of 1960 (U.S.)
