= Ronnie Self =

American rock and roll musician (1938–1981)

- Ronnie Self, 1956

Background information
- Also known as: Mr. Frantic, Mr. Flip Top
- Born: Ronald Keith Self (spelt "Kieth" on tombstone); July 5, 1938; Tin Town, Polk County, Missouri
- Died: August 28, 1981 (aged 43) Springfield, Greene County, Missouri
- Occupations: lead vocalist, guitarist, singer-songwriter, composer, lyricist
- Years active: 1956–1980
- Labels: ABC-Paramount (1956–1957); Columbia (1957–1958); Decca (1959–1962); Scratch (1967); Kapp (1963); Amy (1968)

Ronald Keith "Ronnie" Self (July 5, 1938 – August 28, 1981) was an American singer-songwriter, and guitarist known for his 1957 rock and roll single, "Bop-A-Lena" and his energetic live performances, resulting in being billed with the moniker, Mr. Frantic. Released as a single on Columbia Records in January 1958, it appeared on Billboard charts in the United States and Australia. As a songwriter, Self's compositions spanned multiple genres in the 1960s and 1970s, and BMI credits him with more than 250 works.

Music historian Colin Escott, writing for Bear Family Records, noted a resemblance in intensity, vocal delivery, and fluence on garage rock and proto-punk, and historian Colin Escott described "Bop-A-Lena" as "the first punk record."

== Biography ==
=== Early life, initial recording, ABC-Paramount ===
Ronald Keith Self was born on July 5, 1938 in Tin Town, Polk County, Missouri. The first child of Raymond Keith Self and Hazel (née Sprague) Self, who were farmers and natives of Polk County. They relocated to Springfield in the 1940s when Raymond found work in railroading, and Ronnie was raised in Springfield with one brother, Sammy Ray, and sisters Vicky, Dena, and Rita. the production base of Ozark Jubilee, nationally syndicated on ABC. He began writing songs when he was fourteen, and in 1953 fled to Nashville at fifteen to build a name in country music, returning to Springfield in 1954 due to lack of success. Talent manager Dub Allbritten was sufficiently impressed to arrange a recording session at ABC-Paramount Records.

On April 24, 1956, session logs document the recording of four tracks: "Sweet Love" and "Alone" are catalogued as ABC 9768, though no master recording or copy has been located. The other two tracks, "Pretty Bad Blues" and "Three Hearts Later" were issued as the A-side and B-side of Self's debut single in June 1956. Self promoted the release via an Ozark Jubilee appearance on May 26, 1956, followed by tour stops in Chicago and the Midwest and New Orleans, with strong sales and ample radio airplay on WBOK in greater New Orleans. In July 1956, Self was billed alongside Nat King Cole, Eddie Fontaine, and Bobby Darin at the Chicago gala operated by the Music Operators of America.

=== Philip Morris Caravan, Columbia Records (1957-1958) ===
Albritten secured Self a performing slot among the Philip Morris Caravan, a traveling troupe of musicians assembled by Philip Morris USA for the Philip Morris Country Music Show package tour. Self was the primary rock and roll performer among a predominantly country music cast including Carl Smith, Red Sovine, Goldie Hill, Gordon Terry, and Mimi Roman. The Caravan began performing in January 1957, emceed by Houston, Texas disc jockey Biff Collie, with one early stop serving as a benefit for polio research. Self's physically volatile stage performances attracted immediate attention, with contemporaneous press coverage describing him as "Mr. Flip-top" and "Mr. Frantic," the latter a moniker Allbritten actively promoted. At the time of the tour, Self had already won Billboard Magazine's triple crown award and Downbeat Magazine's best new Western band award for his recording of "Loose Talk." Within weeks, Albritten had parlayed the momentum of Self's touring success into a recording contract with Columbia Records, signed in February 1957.

Recording at Bradley's Barn in Nashville, Tennessee with the Nashville A-Team — session musicians Grady Martin and Hank Garland on guitars, Floyd Chance on bass, Buddy Harman on drums, and Floyd Cramer on piano — and produced by Don Law, the first session yielded "Big Fool" b/w "Flame of Love." Self appeared on American Bandstand on November 29, 1957, shortly before the "Bop-A-Lena" session.

==== Bop-A-Lena and chart success ====
A subsequent single, "Ain't I'm a Dog," actively promoted by Columbia in September 1957, achieved success in New Orleans, Chicago, and Canada. Bob Dylan later featured the recording on the "Dogs" episode of his XM Satellite Radio program Theme Time Radio Hour (Season 1, Episode 16, 2006), remarking it was a shame Self had not had more success as a singer, "because the few records that he did make rocked like nobody's business."

On December 16, 1957, Self recorded "You're So Right for Me" and "Bop-A-Lena" with a different lineup of session musicians from his earlier Columbia work, including guitarists John T. Hill and Ray Edenton. "Bop-A-Lena" became Self's only nationally charted recording, peaking at No. 63 on the Billboard Top 100 in March 1958 and No. 25 in Australia. Billboard's Top 100 Sides noted that for the week ending April 5, the single outsold Elvis Presley's "I Beg of You."

==== Later Columbia singles and departure ====
Columbia issued "Date Bait" b/w "Big Blon' Baby" — the latter covered by Jerry Lee Lewis in November 1958 — as Self's third single. "You're So Right for Me" b/w "Petrified" was released in September 1958, after which his contract was not renewed. Reader surveys published in The Cash Box placed Self among the "Most Promising New Country Male Vocalist" in both 1957 and 1958.

=== Decca Records and transition to songwriting (1959–1962) ===
Self contracted to Decca Records in 1959, recorded and produced by Decca's Regional Vice President, Owen Bradley. His 1960 single "So High" received positive reviews in The Cash Box. His greatest commercial success came as a songwriter, when fellow Decca artist Brenda Lee recorded multiple tracks credited to Self and Allbritten. In 1960, "I'm Sorry" and "Sweet Nothin's" reached No. 1 and No. 4 on the Billboard Hot 100, respectively. "Anybody But Me" reached No. 31 the following year, and "Everybody Loves Me But You" reached No. 6 in 1962.

The co-writing arrangement between Self and Allbritten is explained in Lee's autobiography:

Ronnie was burning bridges left and right. But Dub kept loaning him money and arranging for song-publishing deals and recording sessions, eventually including some with Owen Bradley at Decca. Dub wasn't a songwriter, but his name is listed as the cowriter on a lot of Ronnie's songs. I don't think he was trying to be dishonest. That was the only way Dub could hope to recoup all the money he'd invested in that crazy guy.

In April 1960, Self was a headlining entertainer alongside Tommy Sosebee at the Cockatoo Club in Aurora, Missouri.

=== Later recording career (1963–1968) ===
After Decca, Self recorded isolated singles for Kapp Records (1963), Scratch Records (1967), and Amy Records (1968). In September 1965, Self co-founded Table Rock Music with Si Siman, becoming the lead songwriter for associated labels, such as Skipper and Scratch Si Siman The Country Music Hall of Fame holds a 10" metal acetate demo of "Don't See You" performed by Self for Table Rock Music, Inc. (Object ID TR.04534, 33 1/3 rpm, Table Rock Music, Inc.). In March 1966, Self, Wayne Carson, and Hank Thompson performed at the "Hootenanny for Heart" benefit concert on March 3 at the SMS Field House in Springfield, a benefit for the Greene County Heart Association also featuring Hank Thompson.

=== Personal deterioration and death (1971–1981) ===
In 1971, Dub Allbritten died unexpectedly. He grew increasingly isolated in the years that followed. Friend and fellow artist Wayne Carson recalled that Self experienced a panic attack upon hearing an overdubbed John Philip Sousa orchestral arrangement playing over a copy of "I'm Sorry" gold record and they set the record on fire in front of BMI office. Ronnie and Dorothy Mae Carlton were married and divorced prior to remarrying in February 1970. Dub Allbritten died in 1971, causing Ronnie's mental health to suffer. In December 1980 Self received a suspended one-year county jail term and three years' unsupervised probation following a charge of possession of a firearm while intoxicated.

Suffering from cirrhosis in his later years, Self was living at the Silver Saddle extended-stay motel in Springfield, Missouri when officers responded to the scene on the evening of August 28, 1981. Investigating officers reported the death as a possible overdose of Darvon and alcohol; Greene County Medical Examiner Erwin Busiek declined to order an autopsy, determining no crime had been committed. He was 43 years old. His obituary was published in the Springfield Leader and Press on August 30, 1981.

His sister, Vicki Agee, was a local musician, as is his son Roman (born 1963), and both contributed significantly to archiving and preserving Self's demos and unreleased recordings. Roman Self is an independent artist who released a tribute album, A Tribute to Ronnie Self, in 2003.

== Songwriting ==
Self wrote and recorded over 250 original compositions according to BMI, none collected in a full-length album during his lifetime. His songwriting credits extend across gospel, country, and rock, with the breadth of his output made possible through Allbritten's management connections — access to artists and labels that Self's performing career never reached independently.

In gospel, "Ain't That Beautiful Singing," recorded by Southern gospel vocalist Jake Hess, received the Grammy Award for Best Sacred Performance at the 1970 Grammy Awards. Among his country credits, "Home In My Hand" was covered by Dave Edmunds in 1979 and Foghat, "The Only Way I Laugh" was recorded by Burl Ives, and "Wake Up and Worry" was released on Delta Records by Dusty King. Sammy Self later became a music producer and produced Ronnie's song "6 12-packs Later." His swamp rock composition "A Lion in the Jungle," co-written with Dale Hawkins, was recorded by Carl Perkins in 1969. Johnny Darrell recorded his protest anthem, "Freedom In The Yard" in 1970.

Several Decca sides Self recorded between 1959 and 1962 remained unissued until the 1990 Bear Family retrospective Bop-A-Lena and the 2023 compilation Rocks, among them "Some Other World" and "Go Go the Cannibal," recorded November 15, 1960. Norton Records later released the EP Mr. Frantic, comprising three live performances of "Rocky Road Blues," "Flame of Love," and "Bop-A-Lena" alongside a contemporaneous radio interview, described in 1985 as the primary available audio document of his live performance style outside the studio.

== Legacy ==
A retrospective six days after his death reported: "Most of Self's songs are about death and love gone wrong. Most of Self's stories are too. He destroyed his own tapes and records. Would show up strung out at a club and sit in, only to forget what he was playing in the middle of the song" and that he wrecked three cars in one day in his "I'm Sorry" moneyed period. He was described as proud that he solely made his living at music.

Music historian Colin Escott characterized "Bop-A-Lena" as "the first punk record," while critic Bill Dahl described his career as derailed by "a toxic combination of bad breaks and worse behavior." Self's composition "Big Town" appeared on the soundtrack of the 1987 Columbia Pictures film The Big Town, starring Matt Dillon; in 1990, University of British Columbia campus radio station CiTR devoted a program to his recordings; and in a 1992 interview on Fresh Air, Neil Young named Self among the first records he remembered buying, grouping him alongside Jerry Lee Lewis, Little Richard, and Buddy Holly as formative early purchases. Bob Dylan's 2006 endorsement of "Ain't I'm a Dog" on Theme Time Radio Hour gave the recording renewed exposure among a new generation of listeners.

"Sweet Nothin's" has since been sampled and covered by numerous artists. Producer David Z adapted Brenda Lee's original vocal performance to create the distinctive backing track in Prince's 1986 hit "Kiss."
