= Gus Kahn =

American lyricist (1886–1941)

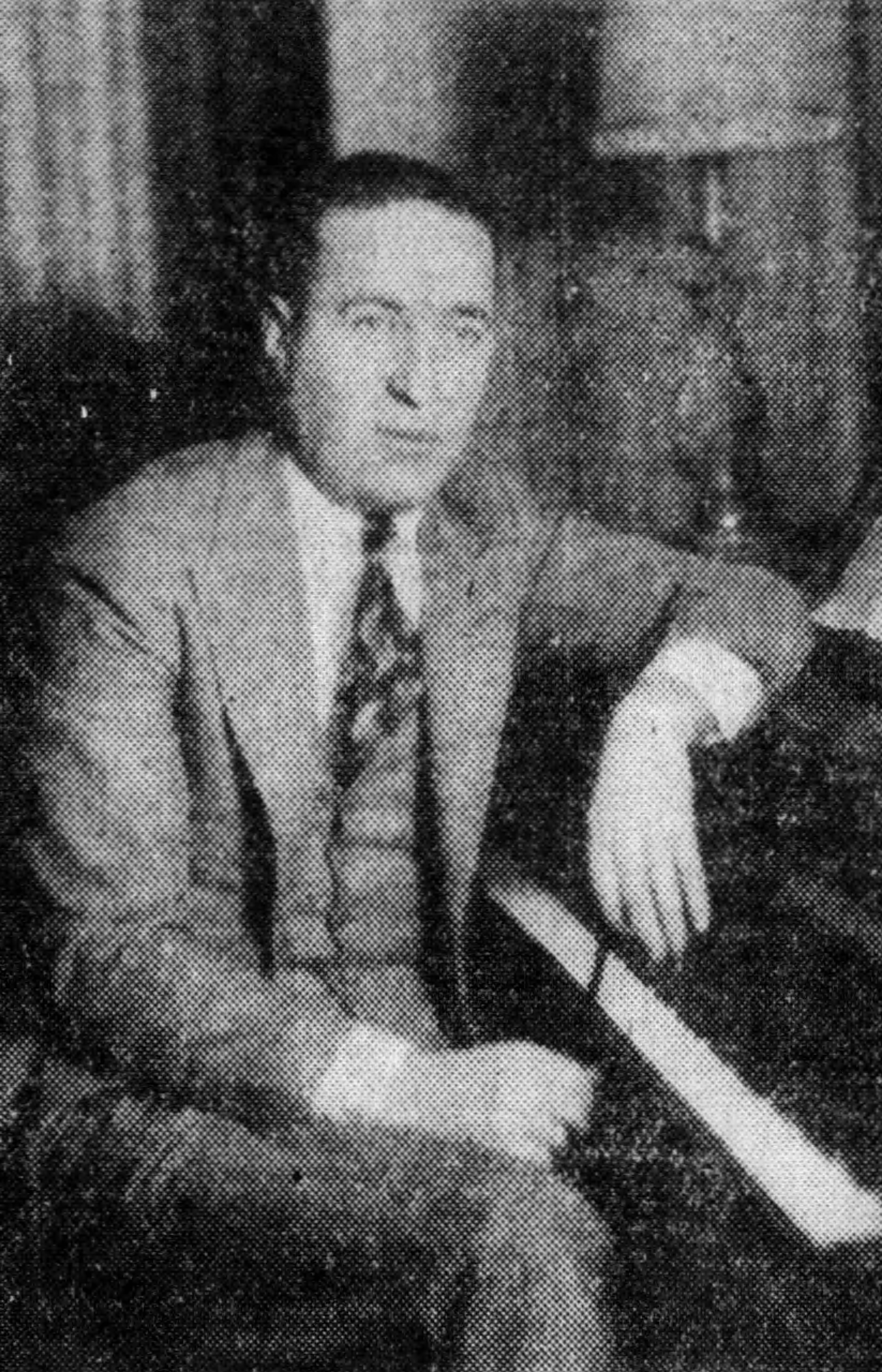
- Kahn, c. 1927

Background information
- Born: Gustav Gerson Kahn; November 6, 1886; Koblenz, Germany
- Died: October 8, 1941 (aged 54) Beverly Hills, California, U.S.
- Occupation: Lyricist

Gustav Gerson Kahn (November 6, 1886 – October 8, 1941) was an American lyricist who contributed a number of songs to the Great American Songbook, including "Pretty Baby", "Ain't We Got Fun?", "Carolina in the Morning", "Toot, Toot, Tootsie (Goo' Bye!)", "My Buddy" "I'll See You in My Dreams", "It Had to Be You", "Yes Sir, That's My Baby", "Love Me or Leave Me", "Makin' Whoopee", "My Baby Just Cares for Me", "I'm Through with Love", "Dream a Little Dream of Me" and "You Stepped Out of a Dream".

== Life and career ==
Kahn was born in 1886 in Bruschied, in the Rhine Province of the Kingdom of Prussia, the son of Theresa (Mayer) and Isaac Kahn, a cattle farmer. The Jewish family immigrated to the United States and moved to Chicago in 1890. After graduating from high school, he worked as a clerk in a mail order business before launching one of the most successful and prolific careers from Tin Pan Alley. Kahn married Grace LeBoy in 1916 and they had two children, Donald and Irene.

In his early days, Kahn wrote special material for vaudeville. In 1913 he began a productive partnership with the well-established composer Egbert Van Alstyne, with whom he created several notable hits of the era, including "Memories" 1915 song and, along with Tony Jackson, "Pretty Baby." Later, he began writing lyrics for composer and bandleader Isham Jones. This partnership led to one of Kahn's best-known works, "I'll See You in My Dreams," which became the title of a 1951 movie based on his life, starring Danny Thomas as Kahn and Doris Day as his wife, Grace LeBoy Kahn.

Kahn was a lyricist for the 1919 musical Oh, What A Girl! which featured a score co-authored by Jacques Presburg and Charles Jules. Throughout the 1920s, he continued to contribute to Broadway scores such as Holka Polka (1925), Kitty's Kisses (1926), Artists and Models (1927), Whoopee! (1928), and Show Girl (1929). He went on to write song lyrics for several movies, primarily for Metro-Goldwyn-Mayer.

By 1933, Kahn had become a full-time motion picture songwriter, contributing to movies such as Flying Down to Rio, Thanks a Million, Kid Millions, A Day at the Races, Everybody Sing, One Night of Love, Three Smart Girls, Let's Sing Again, San Francisco, Naughty Marietta, and Ziegfeld Girl.

He also collaborated with co-lyricist Ira Gershwin and with some of the finest composers, including Grace LeBoy Kahn (his wife), Richard A. Whiting, Isham Jones, Buddy DeSylva, Al Jolson, Raymond Egan, Ted Fio Rito, Ernie Erdman, Neil Moret, Vincent Youmans, George Gershwin, Harry Akst, Harry M. Woods, Edward Eliscu, Victor Schertzinger, Arthur Johnston, Bronisław Kaper, Jerome Kern, Walter Jurmann, Sigmund Romberg, and Harry Warren, though his primary collaborator was Walter Donaldson.

He had a long friendship with Walter Donaldson. Their first collaboration was the song My Buddy in 1922. They went on to compose over one hundred songs together.

== Death and legacy ==
Kahn died in Beverly Hills, California, on October 8, 1941, of a heart attack at age 54. He was interred in the Forest Lawn Memorial Park Cemetery in Glendale, California.

His catalog contained some of the greatest collections of songs from the first half of the 20th century, and it is for this reason that he was inducted into the Songwriters Hall of Fame in 1970, nearly 30 years after his death. His son, songwriter and musician Donald Kahn, died at the age of 89 on April 11, 2008, in Beverly Hills, California. His daughter, Irene, was married to Arthur Marx, the son of Groucho Marx.

Gus Kahn's most famous songs include "My Buddy" (1922) with music by Walter Donaldson; "It Had To Be You" (1924), with music by Isham Jones; and "Makin' Whoopee" (1928), with music by Walter Donaldson. Kahn was also the lyricist for the Ted Healy/Three Stooges short film Beer and Pretzels (1933), with music by Al Goodhart. Kahn has been incorrectly associated with the song "Side by Side", which has words and music by Harry M. Woods.

Kahn's papers are housed at the Great American Songbook Foundation.

Danny Thomas played Kahn opposite Doris Day as Grace LeBoy in the 1951 film I'll See You in my Dreams.

== Selected songs ==
- "I Wish I had a Girl" (1907)
- "Everybody Rag with Me" (1914)
- "Memories" (1915)
- "Pretty Baby" (1916)
- "So Long, Mother" (1917). m: Egbert Van Alstyne
- "Cherry Blossom" (1917). m: Harry Ramond
- "On the Road to Home Sweet Home" (1917). m: Egbert Van Alstyne
- "Scouting in the U.S.A" (1917). m: Edith Goodland Bartlett
- "For the Boys Over There" (1918). m: Egbert Van Alstyne
- "What Are You Going to Do to Help the Boys?" (1918). m: Egbert Van Alstyne
- "For Your Boy and My Boy" (1918). m: Egbert Van Alstyne
- "Give a Little Credit to the Navy" (1918). m: Albert Gumble
- "It Might as Well Be You" (1918). L: Egbert Van Alstyne
- "Put Your Hands in your Pocket and Give, Give, Give" (1918). m: Egbert Van Alstyne
- "Tell the Folks in Dixie I'll Be Back There Some Day" (1918). m: Egbert Van Alstyne
- "Your Eyes Have Told Me So" (1919)
- "I Can't Get Along Without You" (1919). m: Robert Van Alstyne
- "I'll Wait for You" (1919). m: Egbert Van Alstyne
- "Ain't We Got Fun?" (1921)
- "Carolina in the Morning" (1922)
- "Toot, Toot, Tootsie (Goo' Bye!)" (1922)
- "My Buddy" (1922)
- "On the Alamo" (1922)
- "Swingin' Down the Lane" (1923)
- "Charley, My Boy" (1924)
- "I'll See You in My Dreams" (1924)
- "It Had to Be You" (1924)
- "When You and I Were Seventeen" (1924)
- "Sometime" (1925)
- "I Wonder Where My Baby Is Tonight" (1925)
- "Yes Sir, That's My Baby" (1925)
- "Ukulele Lady" (1925)
- "Let's Talk About My Sweetie" (1926) m: Walter Donaldson
- "Persian Rug" (1927)
- "Chlo-e" (1927)
- "Love Me or Leave Me" (1928)
- "Makin' Whoopee" (1928)
- "Liza (All the Clouds'll Roll Away)" w/ Ira Gershwin (1929)
- "Goofus" (1930)
- "My Baby Just Cares for Me" (1930)
- "I'm Through with Love" (1931)
- "Dream a Little Dream of Me" (1931)
- "Guilty" (1931)
- "Thanks for the Pines" (1931)
- "Carioca" (1934)
- "San Francisco" or "Theme from San Francisco" (Music: Bronislaw Kaper and Walter Jurmann) (San Francisco (1936 film))
- "My Heart Is Singing" (Music: Bronislaw Kaper and Walter Jurmann) (Three Smart Girls, 1936)
- "Someone to Care for Me" (Music: Bronislaw Kaper and Walter Jurmann) (Three Smart Girls, 1936)
- "The Show Must Go On" (Music: Bronislaw Kaper and Walter Jurmann) (Three Smart Girls, 1936)
- "Waltzing in the Clouds" (1940)
- "You Stepped Out of a Dream" (1940)
