= Egbert Van Alstyne =

American songwriter and pianist (1878–1915)

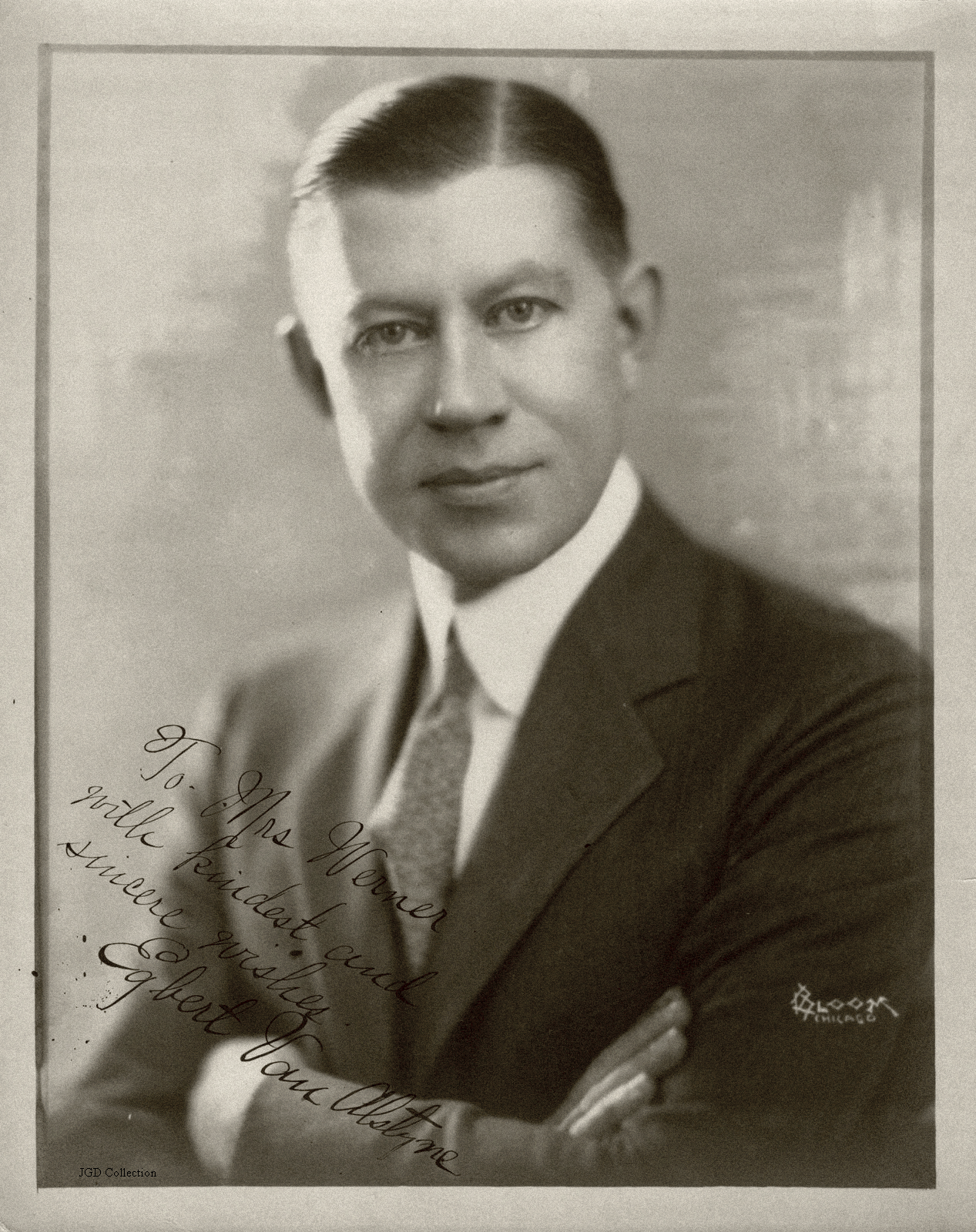
- Taken by Bloom Studio, Chicago, IL
- Born: Egbert Anson Van Alstyne; March 4, 1878; Marengo, Illinois, U.S.
- Died: July 9, 1951 (aged 73); Chicago, Illinois, U.S.
- Occupations: Songwriter, pianist

Egbert Anson Van Alstyne (March 4, 1878 – July 9, 1951) was an American songwriter and pianist. Van Alstyne was the composer of a number of popular and ragtime tunes of the early 20th century.

== Biography ==
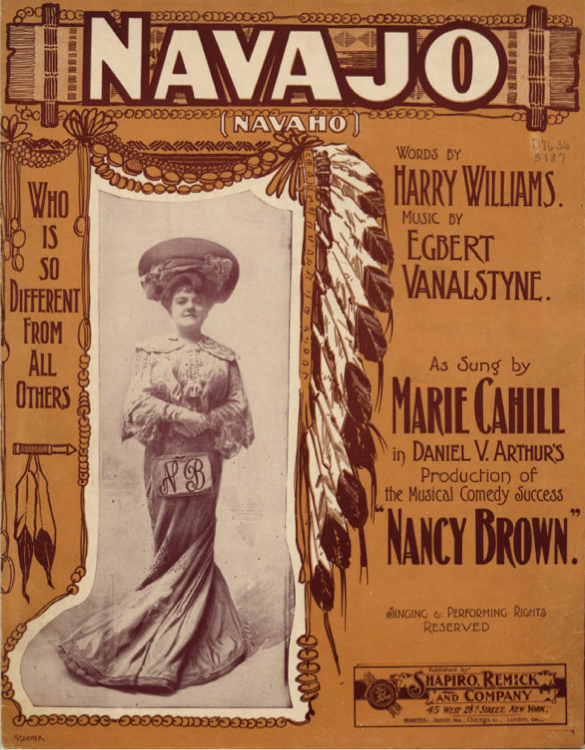
Cover of 1903 composition "Navajo"

Egbert Van Alstyne was born on March 4, 1878 in Marengo, Illinois. He studied music at Cornell College where he was a student by January 1894 at the age of 15. He transferred to the Chicago Musical College and began writing songs while a student there in the late 1890s. He began his career as a keyboardist playing first in a traveling circus, and then touring in vaudeville. It was during this time that he met Harry H. Williams with whom he performed on tour. Williams, a lyricist, became his songwriting partner.

In 1901 Van Alstyne and Williams moved to New York City. There he initially working as a Tin Pan Alley song-plugger until he was able to make his living as a songwriter. He teamed with lyricist Harry H. Williams. Their first success was "Navajo" which was introduced in the Broadway musical Nancy Brown in 1903 and became one of the first records by Billy Murray early in 1904. Their best remembered song is "In the Shade of the Old Apple Tree" from 1905.

Alstyne wrote the scores to the Broadway musicals Down the Pike (1904), Tom, Dick and Harry (1905), Not Yet, But Soon (1907), A Broken Idol (1909), and Girlies (1910). He also wrote songs which were interpolated into musicals by other composers.

In 1913 Egbert Van Alstyne and lyricist Gus Kahn began a productive partnership creating several notable hits of the era, including "Memories". Other Van Alstyne hits included "Won't You Come Over to My House?" and "I'm Afraid to Come Home in the Dark".

Van Alstyne shares credit with Tony Jackson on the hit "Pretty Baby". It was common for Tin Pan Alley publishers to add the name of one of their famous hit makers to tunes, and many have speculated this as being the main reason for Van Alstyne's name appearing on the piece, but Van Alstyne may have had a hand in writing or modifying the verse to Jackson's famous chorus.

Postcard illustrating the song "Back, Back, Back to Baltimore" circa 1907

He recorded a number of piano rolls.

Van Alstyne lived for many years in Chicago. He died there on July 9, 1951, and was buried in Memorial Park Cemetery in Evanston, Illinois.

== Works, 1900–1920 ==
- "Rag-time Chimes: Characteristic Two Step" (1900)
- "Echoes from Egypt" (1901)
- "Navajo" (1903)
- "Back, Back, Back to Baltimore" (1904)
- "Seminole" (1904)
- "There's a Chicken Dinner Waitin' Home for Me" (1904)
- "The Cob Web Man" (1905)
- "Down in Lovers Lane" (1905)
- "Good-A-Bye John" (1905)
- "I Want Someone To Love Me" (1905)
- "In Sunny Little Italy" (1905)
- "The Janitor" (1905)
- "A Man May Go to College and Still Be a Fool" (1905)
- "My Nightingale" (1905)
- "Nicodemus" (1905)
- "Senora Papeta" (1905)
- "There's a Little Fighting Blood In Me" (1905)
- "Why Don't You Try" (1905)
- "I'm Wise" (1906)
- "I'm Going Right Back to Chicago" (1906)
- "Shoulder Straps" (1906)
- "My Irish Girl" (1906)
- "Owatonna (Indian Song)" (1906)
- "Camp Meeting Time" (1906)
- "Sally" (1906)
- "Won't You Come Over to My House" (1906)
- "Down in the Everglade" (1906)
- "My Irish Girl" (1906)
- "Those Are Things That Happen Every Day" (1906)
- "The Union of the Blue and the Grey" (1906)
- "Larry" (1906)
- "I'm Afraid to Come Home in the Dark" (1907)
- "Neeth the Old Cherry Tree Sweet Marie" (1907)
- "In the Land of the Buffalo" (1907)
- "Ain't You Glad You've Found Me" (1907)
- "That's the Sign of a Honeymoon" (1908)
- "Ivanhoe - Not Scott's Ivanhoe, but a Scotch Ivanhoe" (1908)
- "I Was a Hero Too" (1908)
- "Song of the Waiters" from A Broken Idol (1909)
- "A Little China Doll" from A Broken Idol (1909)
- "That's the Sign of a Honeymoon" from A Broken Idol (1909)
- "Alabama" from "A Broken Idol" (1909)
- "Love Makes the World Go Round" from A Broken Idol (1909)
- "Marie" from A Broken Idol (1909)
- "Golden Arrow" (1909)
- "Heinze" (1909)
- "Go Back: Song" (1909)
- "Bonnie Annie Laurie" (1909)
- "Heinze is Pickled Again" (1909)
- "Cavalier Rustican' Rag" (1910)
- "Baby Talk" from "Girlies" (1910)
- "That's Good" from "Girlies" (1910)
- "The Raggity Man" from "Over the River" (1911)
- "Injun Love" from "Over the River" (1911)
- "Oh That Navajo Rag" (1911)
- "Little Girls Beware (of the Sirens)" from The Siren (1911)
- "I'm Goin' Back to Oklahoma" (1912)
- "Blarney" (1914)
- "On The Road to Mexico" (1914)
- "I Want a Little Love From You." (1915)
- "When I Was a Dreamer (And You Were My Dream)" (1915)
- "My Tom Tom Man" (1915)
- "On the Road to Home Sweet Home" (1916)
- "Where the Shamrock Grows" (1916)
- "My Dreamy China Lady" (1916)
- "Alabama Moon" (1917)
- "Rock-A-Bye Land" (1917)
- "I've Been Fiddle-ing Song" (1917)
- "Because You're Irish Song" (1917)
- "So Long, Mother" (1917)
- "Swingin' Along with Lindy" from "Just Around the Corner" (1918)
- "What Are You Going to Do to Help the Boys?" (1918)
- "For Your Boy and My Boy" (1918)
- "Some Quiet Afternoon" from "Good Morning, Judge" (1919)
- "Sweetie O' Mine" (1920)

== Awards and honors ==
He was inducted into Songwriters Hall of Fame in 1970.
