= Ziegfeld: The Man and His Women =

- Genre: Biography; Drama
- Written by: Joanna Lee
- Directed by: Buzz Kulik
- Starring: Paul Shenar; Samantha Eggar; Barbara Parkins; Valerie Perrine; Inga Swenson
- Music by: Richard Benedictis
- Country of origin: United States
- Original language: English

Production
- Executive producer: M. J. Frankovich
- Producer: Buzz Kulik
- Production locations: Stage 16, Warner Brothers Burbank Studios - 4000 Warner Boulevard, Burbank, California
- Cinematography: Gerald Perry Finnerman
- Editor: Les Green
- Running time: 150 minutes
- Production companies: Frankovich Productions; Columbia Pictures Television

Original release
- Network: NBC
- Release: May 21, 1978

Ziegfeld: The Man and His Women is a 1978 television biopic based on the life of theater impresario Florenz Ziegfeld. It was directed by Buzz Kulik and stars Paul Shenar as Ziegfeld, Samantha Eggar as Billie Burke, Barbara Parkins as Anna Held, Walter Willison as Frank Carter, Catherine Jacoby (aka Loria Parker) as Fanny Brice, and Inga Swenson as Nora Bayes. It was produced by Columbia Pictures (filmed at Warner's Burbank Studios) and first aired on NBC in May 1978. Patricia Ziegfeld Stephenson, daughter of Ziegfeld and Billie Burke, was a consultant on the film. The film was nominated for several Emmy Awards for 1978 winning in the cinematography category, Gerald Finnerman.

The film has been shown in various versions. It originally aired on NBC, with commercials. It later showed up on Showtime cable in the 1980s without the commercial disruption which allowed a better flow of the episodic segments. Another truncated (shortened) version has appeared on Starz cable.

== Synopsis ==
A chronicle of Florenz Ziegfeld's life from his earliest memories in Chicago, recounting the Fire of 1871 to the many luminaries he was connected to. The storyline is episodic with many of the key women in his life introducing segments in which they were involved with Ziegfeld, some for the better, some for the worst. Other important historical people include Bert Williams, Irving Berlin, Eddie Cantor, Charles Frohman and Nora Bayes.

== Cast ==
- Paul Shenar – Florenz Ziegfeld
- Samantha Eggar – Billie Burke
- David Levy – Irving Berlin
- Barbara Parkins – Anna Held
- Pamela Peadon – Marilyn Miller
- Valerie Perrine – Lillian Lorraine
- Walter Willison – Frank Carter
- Gene McLaughlin – Will Rogers
- Richard Shea – Eddie Cantor
- Catherine Jacoby – Fanny Brice
- David Downing – Bert Williams
- Inga Swenson – Nora Bayes
- Ron Husmann – Jack Norworth
- Cliff Norton – Abe Erlanger
- David Opatoshu – Florenz's father
- Bruce Willis - Extra (uncredited)

== See also ==
- The Great Ziegfeld (1936)
