= At Home with Billie Burke =

1950s television show

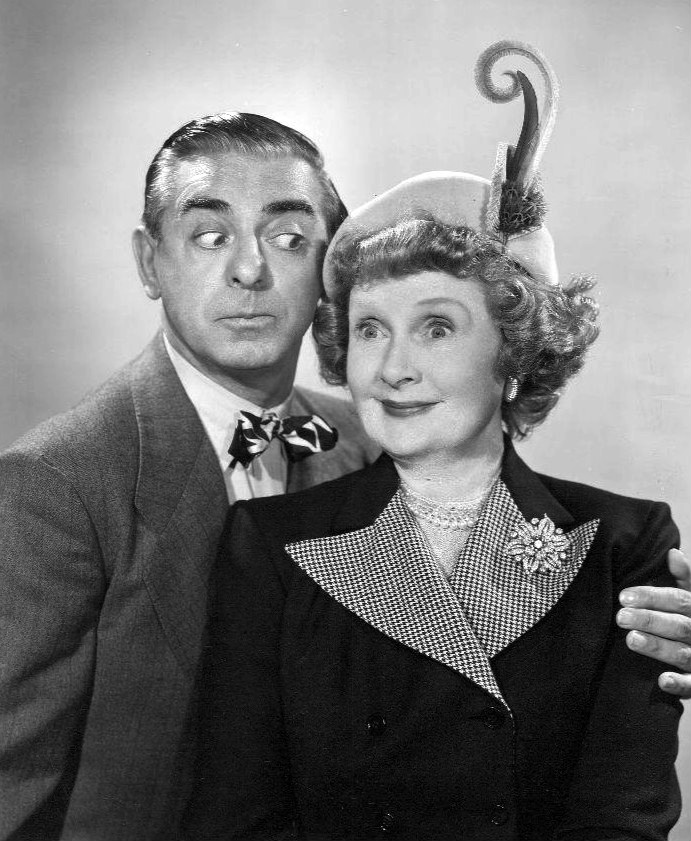
- Eddie Cantor and Burke (c. 1950)
- Genre: Talk show
- Starring: Billie Burke
- Country of origin: United States
- Original language: English

Production
- Running time: 30 minutes

Original release
- Network: DuMont
- Release: June 1951 – 1952

At Home With Billie Burke is a TV talk show starring Billie Burke which aired on the DuMont Television Network from June 1951 to the spring of 1952.

== Preservation status ==
Little is known of the series, even if it was a daytime or prime time series, except that one episode survives at the Paley Center for Media.

The UCLA Film and Television Archive has one episode of another TV series The Billie Burke Show (c. 1958), possibly syndicated, directed by John F. Link Sr. and produced by Talbot Lewis for Seawalla and Golden Nugget Productions. In this latter show, sponsored by Candlelight Cosmetics, Burke is seen responding to letters sent to her by viewers.

The Billie Burke Show was also the name of Burke's CBS Radio show which aired Saturday mornings from April 3, 1943, to September 21, 1946.

== See also ==
- List of programs broadcast by the DuMont Television Network
- List of surviving DuMont Television Network broadcasts
- 1951-52 United States network television schedule

== Bibliography ==
- David Weinstein, The Forgotten Network: DuMont and the Birth of American Television (Philadelphia: Temple University Press, 2004) ISBN 1-59213-245-6
- Alex McNeil, Total Television, Fourth edition (New York: Penguin Books, 1980) ISBN 0-14-024916-8
- Tim Brooks and Earle Marsh, The Complete Directory to Prime Time Network TV Shows, Third edition (New York: Ballantine Books, 1964) ISBN 0-345-31864-1
