= The Land of Promise =

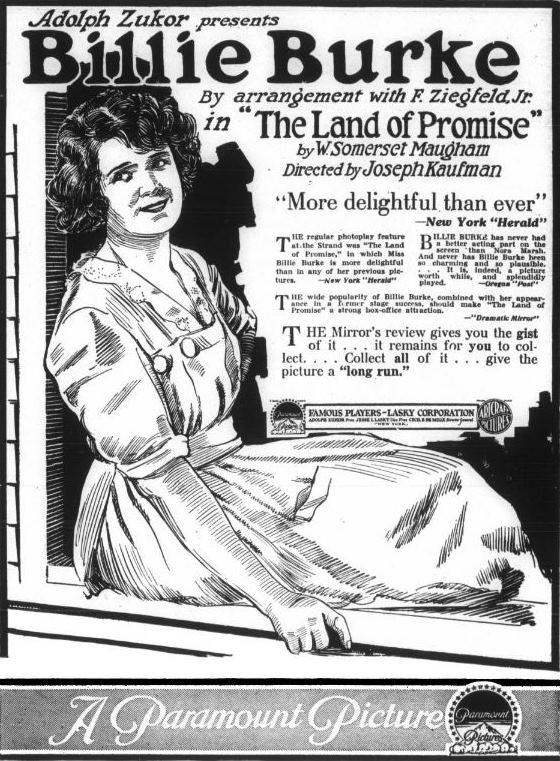
- Advertisement
- Directed by: Joseph Kaufman
- Written by: Charles Whittaker (scenario)
- Based on: The Land of Promise by W. Somerset Maugham
- Produced by: Florenz Ziegfeld, Jr. Adolph Zukor; Jesse L. Lasky
- Starring: Billie Burke; Thomas Meighan
- Cinematography: William Marshall
- Production company: Famous Players–Lasky
- Distributed by: Paramount Pictures
- Release date: December 9, 1917
- Running time: 5 reels
- Country: United States
- Language: Silent (English intertitles)

The Land of Promise is a 1917 American silent comedy drama film produced by Famous Players–Lasky and distributed by Paramount Pictures. It was directed by Joseph Kaufman and starred Billie Burke and Thomas Meighan. The film is based on the 1913 play The Land of Promise by W. Somerset Maugham, in which Burke starred.

The film was remade in 1926 by Paramount as The Canadian with Thomas Meighan reprising his role as Frank Taylor.

== Plot ==
As described in a film magazine, when her employer dies, leaving her penniless, Nora Marsh decides to make her home with her brother Edward in Canada. However, she cannot get along with her sister-in-law Gertie and she has to find a way out of the house. A hired man, Frank Taylor owns a farm of his own but a storm has destroyed his crops and forced him to work. Shortly after Nora's arrival he leaves for his farm but not before Nora hears him remarking that he intends to get a woman to be his wife and housekeeper, to which Nora decides to take a chance. They get married and he takes her to his house where Nora finally feels she has found a home but before long, Taylor's crops are infested and his entire harvest is destroyed. At the same time, Nora receives some money from England and is thinking of leaving Taylor and moving there but when she learns that he will have to be a hired man again, she decides to stay and give him the money she received so they could save his farm.

== Cast ==
- Billie Burke as Nora Marsh
- Thomas Meighan as Frank Taylor
- Helen Tracy as Miss Eunice Wickam
- Jack W. Johnston as Edward Marsh (aka J. W. Johnston)
- Mary Alden as Gertie Marsh
- Margaret Seddon as Miss Pringle
- Walter McEwen as James Wickham
- Grace Studdiford as Mrs. Wickham (* unclear whether this woman and Grace Van Studdiford are one and the same)
- John Raymond as Reginald Hornby

== Preservation status ==
The House That Shadows Built (1931) promotional film by Paramount, contains an unidentified Billie Burke clip almost certainly from The Land of Promise. Other than this brief clip, this is considered a lost film.
