= Peggy (1916 film) =

1916 film by Charles Giblyn, Thomas H. Ince

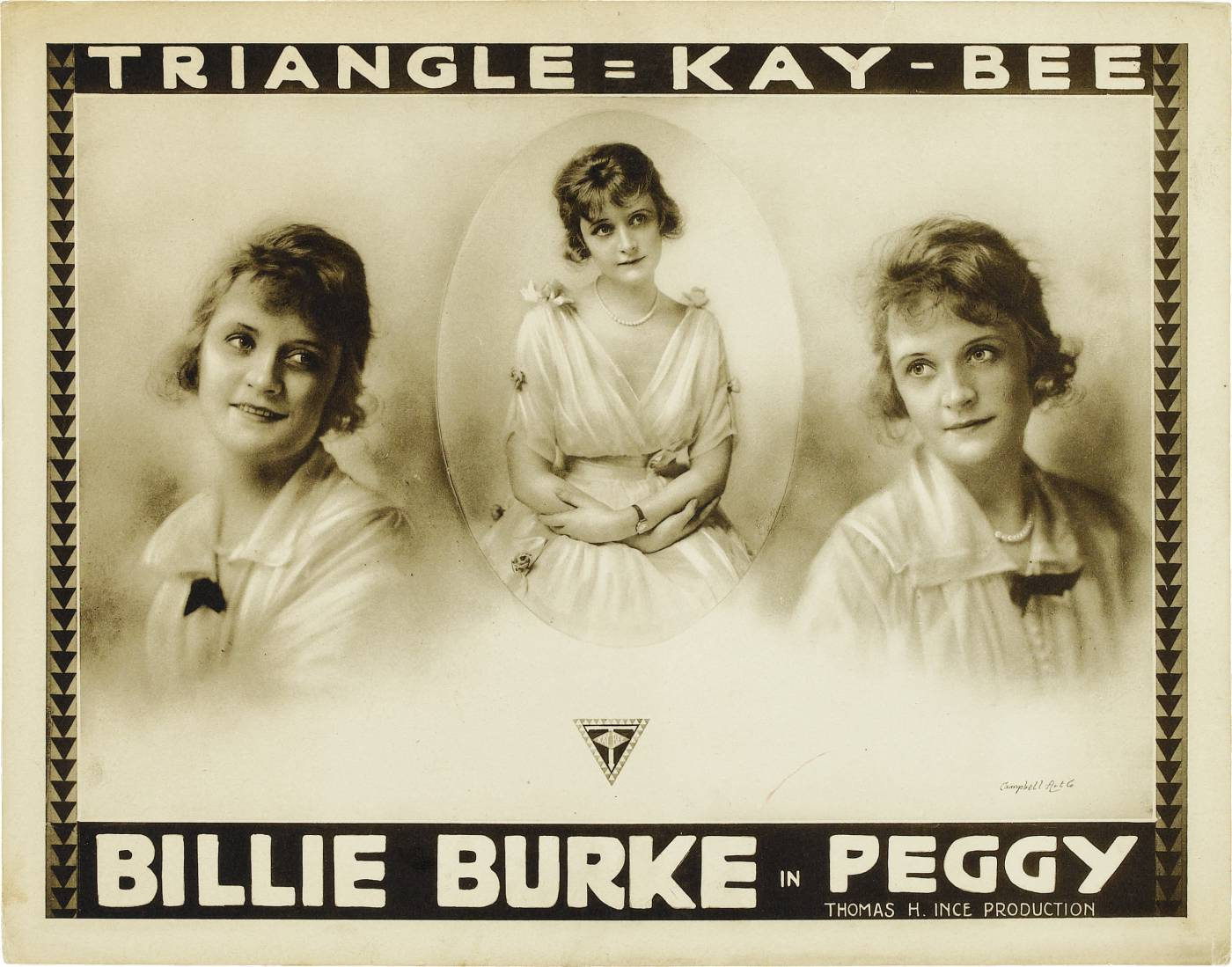
- Lobby card poster
- Directed by: Thomas Ince; Charles Giblyn
- Written by: C. Gardner Sullivan
- Starring: Billie Burke
- Music by: Victor Schertzinger
- Distributed by: Triangle Film Corporation
- Release date: January 16, 1916
- Running time: 70 minutes
- Country: United States
- Languages: Silent; English intertitles

Peggy (also known as The Devil's Pepper Pot) is a 1916 American silent comedy film produced and directed by Thomas Ince and stars Billie Burke in her motion picture debut.

== Plot ==
The film follows Peggy Cameron, a young, high spirited American debutante who is sent to visit her Uncle Andrew and cousin Colin in Scotland.

== Cast ==
- Billie Burke as Peggy Cameron
- William H. Thompson as Andrew Cameron
- William Desmond as Reverend Donald Bruce
- Charles Ray as Colin Cameron
- Nona Thomas as Janet McLeod
- Gertrude Claire as Mrs. Cameron
- Truly Shattuck as Mrs. Van Allyn
- Claire Du Brey (uncredited)

== Production ==
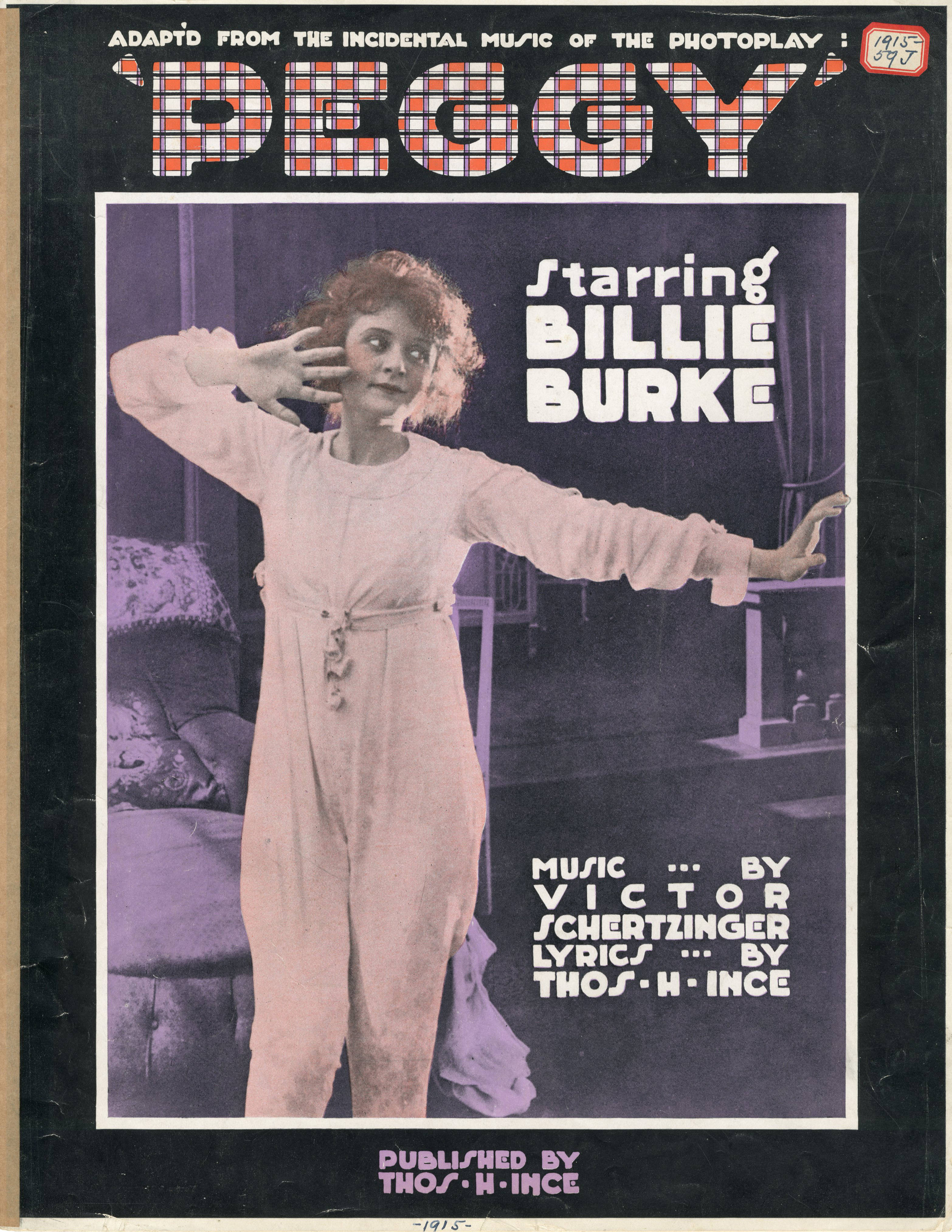
Sheet music of Peggy

Triangle Film Corporation produced Peggy. Victor L. Schertzinger composed the film's score. In conjunction with the film's release, sheet music of a song, Peggy, was published, the first time a song based on a silent film's incidental music had been written and published. The cover of the sheet music shows Schertzinger as the composer and Ince as the lyricist.

A Wright Model B airplane was used as a wind machine. The airplane was tethered to the ground while its engine and propellers were run.

== Survival status ==
Once thought lost, the film was reconstructed from two safety elements held by the Academy Film Archive, with original color tinting reconstructed digitally. The main title card and final reel do not survive in any form, and these scenes were filled in with stills from the Margaret Herrick Library and text from the 1916 copyright registration.
