= Arms and the Girl =

1917 American silent film

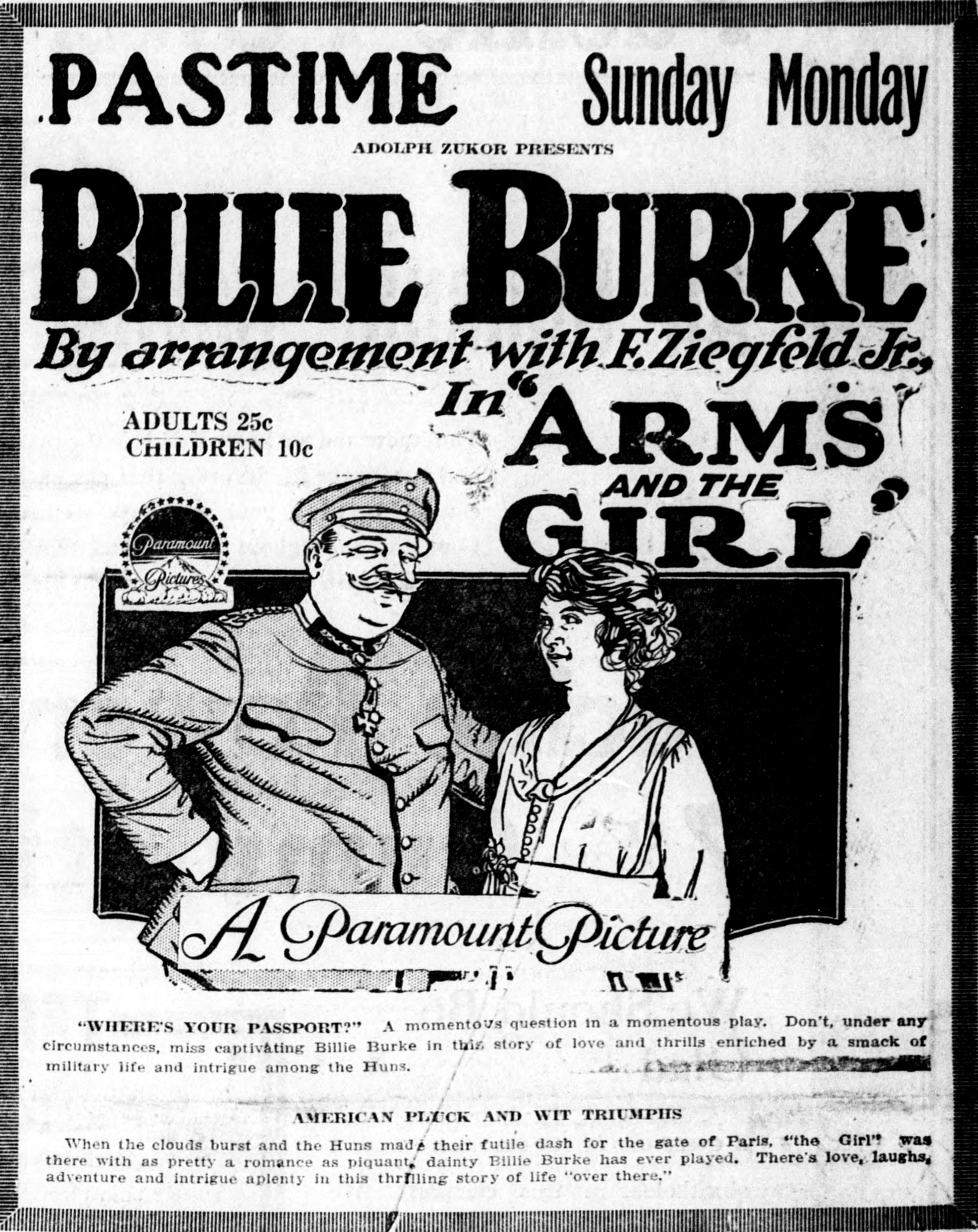
- Newspaper advertisement.
- Directed by: Joseph Kaufman
- Written by: Charles Whittaker (scenario)
- Based on: Arms and the Girl by Grant Stewart and Robert Baker
- Produced by: Adolph Zukor; Jesse Lasky
- Starring: Billie Burke; Thomas Meighan
- Cinematography: William Marshall
- Distributed by: Paramount Pictures
- Release date: October 1917
- Running time: 50 minutes
- Country: United States
- Language: Silent (English intertitles)

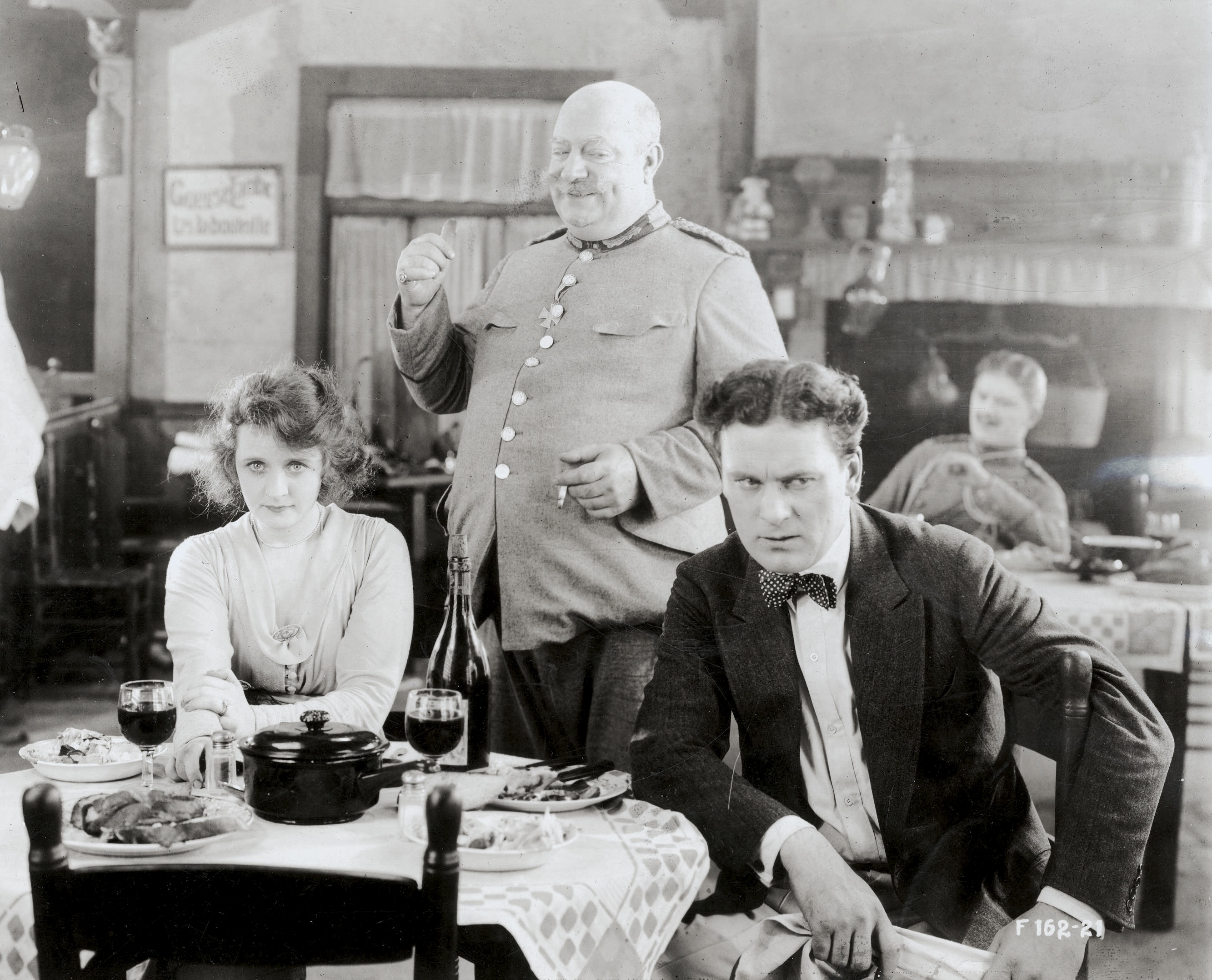
Film still with Burke and Meighan

Arms and the Girl is a 1917 American silent drama film produced by Famous Players–Lasky and distributed by Paramount Pictures. It was directed by Joseph Kaufman and stars Billie Burke. The film is one of the few of director Kaufman's to survive and the earliest known Billie Burke silent to survive.

The film is based on a 1917 Broadway play which starred a young Fay Bainter.

== Plot ==
As described in a film magazine, during August 1914 Ruth Sherwood, an American traveling through Belgium with her parents, is left behind in Beaupre while sending a message to her fiancé in Paris. She is compelled to seek shelter at the Hotel Tete d'Or as there are no more trains that day. Here she meets another American, Wilfred Ferrers. Ruth's passport is stolen by Olga Karnovitch, a Russian spy, who leaves her Russian passport in Ruth's hands.

The town is invaded by Germans who are headed towards Paris, and they make the inn their headquarters. Ferrers is discovered destroying the Russian passport and is ordered to be shot at once. Ruth comes to his assistance by claiming that he is her fiancé. The German officer is skeptical, and he orders that they be married at once. The ceremony is held beneath the upheld swords of the Germans, and an embarrassing night follows as the couple retire to their room. Ferrers overcomes the sentinel at their door, dons his uniform, and forces the General at the point of a gun to give them a pass to get through the German lines into France.

In the meantime, Jack Martin, Ruth's fiancé, arrives, but she says that he is her chauffeur. Ferrers gives Jack the pass, but Ruth refuses to leave Ferrers, having fallen in love with her "husband." The Germans receive orders to move on and as Ferrers enters the inn to urge Ruth to depart at once, he is shot by the outraged General. Ruth borrows a smock from the innkeeper and with Ferrers makes her escape across the border into France.

== Cast ==
- Billie Burke as Ruth Sherwood
- Thomas Meighan as Wilfred Ferrers
- Louise Bates as Olga Karnovitch
- J. Malcolm Dunn as Eugene
- Arthur Bauer as Burgomaster
- William David as Jack Martin
- George S. Trimble as The General
- Harry Lee
- May De Lacy (uncredited)

== Survival status ==
A copy of Arms and the Girl is preserved at the George Eastman Museum Motion Picture Collection in Rochester, New York.
