= The Intimate Strangers (play) =

1921 play by Booth Tarkington

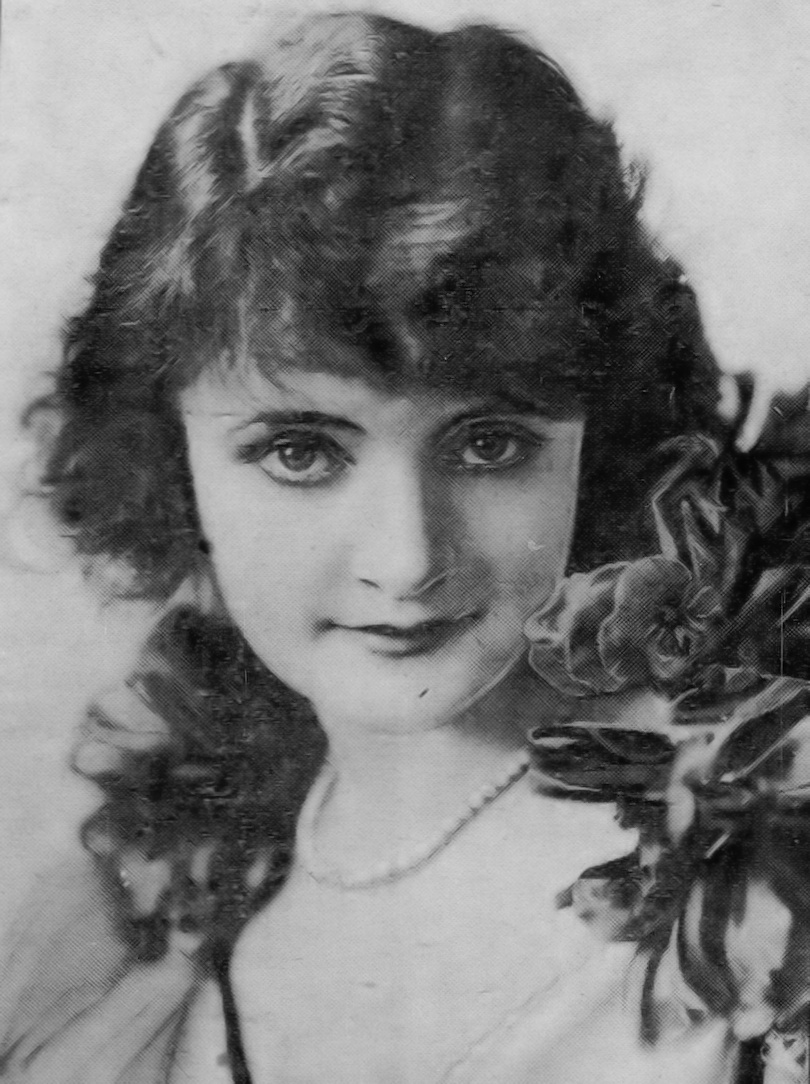
- Billie Burke in 1921
- Original language: English
- Written by: Booth Tarkington
- Subject: Intergenerational romance
- Genre: Comedy
- Setting: A Railway Station and a Living Room

Premiere
- Date: November 7, 1921
- Place: Henry Miller's Theatre
- Directed by: Ira Hards

The Intimate Strangers is a 1921 play by Booth Tarkington. It is a three-act comedy with two settings and eight characters. The action of the play takes place within 24 hours. The story concerns a naive old-fashioned bachelor, teased by a pretend spinster, with a younger couple serving as competition. Tarkington wrote the play with Maude Adams in mind, but when she was unavailable, it became a vehicle for Billie Burke.

The play was produced by a consortium including Abe Erlanger, Charles Dillingham, and Florenz Ziegfeld. It was staged by Ira Hards, and starred Burke, with Alfred Lunt, Frances Howard, and Glen Hunter. It had a tryout in Washington, D. C., a week before it premiered on Broadway during November 1921. It ran through January 1922 for 91 performances, before going on tour.

The play was never revived on Broadway, but was adapted for an episode of Kraft Television Theatre in 1951.

== Characters ==
Characters are listed in order of appearance within their scope.

Lead

- William Ames is a forty-year old New York City attorney, with a dislike for modern young women.
- Isabel Stuart is 28, a single woman of means who fools Ames into thinking she is much older.

Supporting

- Florence is 19, niece to Ellen and grand-niece to Isabel, lively and outspoken, but not as smart as she thinks.
- Johnnie White is 20, advised by faculty to leave college, who owns a car and likes Florence.

Featured

- The Station Master works for a narrow-gauge branch line that runs near Amity.
- Aunt Ellen Stuart is elderly and old-fashioned, a "half-niece" to Isabel, due to a late second marriage. (Note: The term "half-niece" is used in the published play where "step-daughter" or perhaps "step-sister" seems more likely. Tarkington never elucidates the relationship between Aunt Ellen and Isabel's father. The point is that the much younger Isabel owns several farms and has family seniority over Ellen.)
- Henry is Isabel's handyman, a youngish-looking middle-aged easygoing fellow.
- Mattie is Isabel's housekeeper, plain-spoken and frank.

== Synopsis ==
The humor revolves around the complicated family relationship, which is only partially revealed during the course of the play, and the competition between Isabel and Florence. William Ames was on a vacation when he was stranded at an isolated station north of Utica, New York, by a storm that washed out a bridge and communication lines. Also stranded is Isabel Stuart. Though they noticed each other on the train, they didn't speak until marooned at the station. When the play begins, they had been at the station for ten hours, with their only company the station master's brother-in-law, who has since departed.

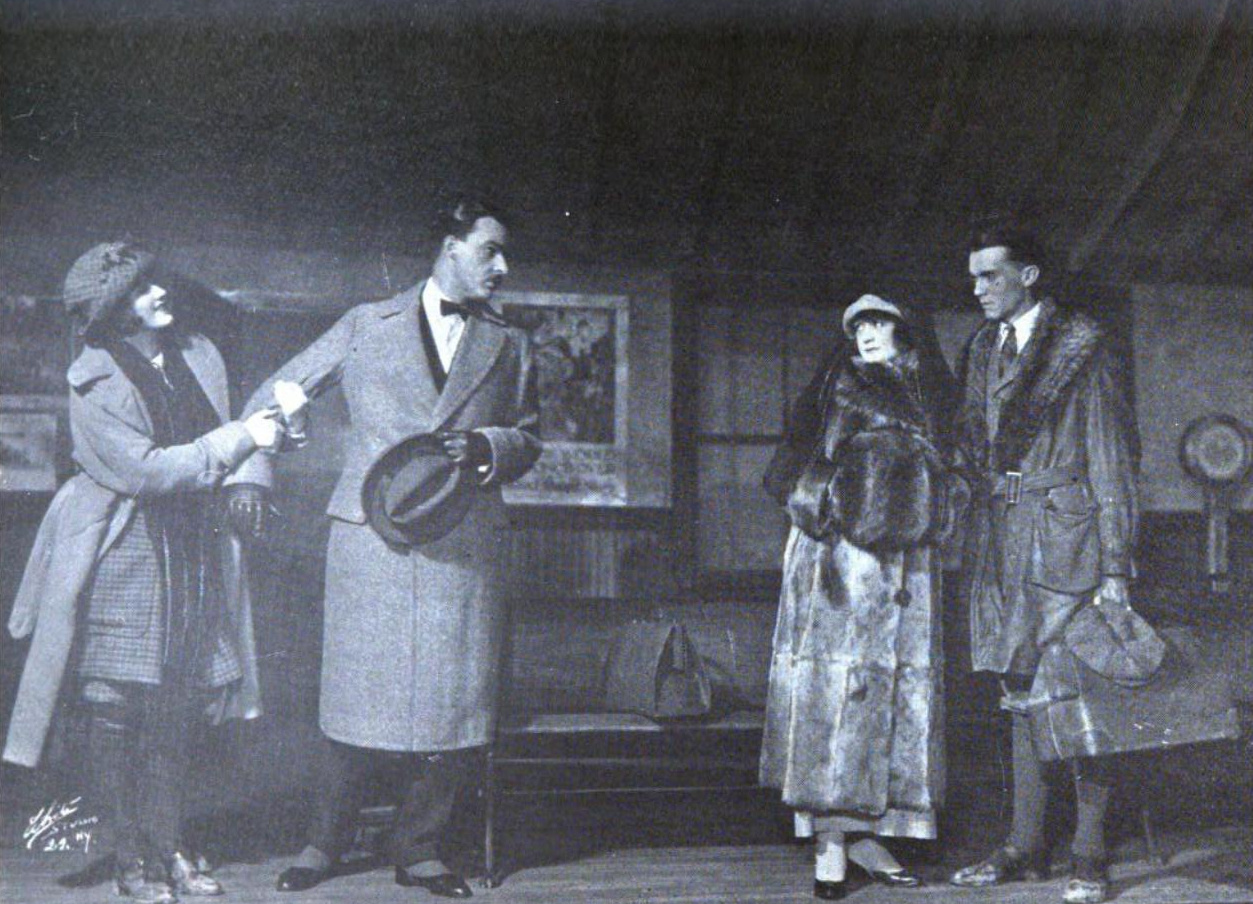

Act I (Interior of a railway station in upstate New York. A night in April.) The Station Master enters the darkened station to find Ames sleeping on a bench. Through exposition, it appears Ames and Isabel, who is sitting on a trunk on the platform, haven't spoken for hours. Isabel shared her lunch with Ames, but the Station Master confirms there is no prospect of further food, nor any information on when the railway will resume operation. During their isolation Ames had told Isabel of his dislike for flighty young women. The more experienced Isabel found it easy to lead Ames on by feigning an older age, and eventually Ames confesses an attraction for her. But Florence arrives in a burst of energy; she had Johnnie drive her forty miles at night to pick up Isabel at the station. Naturally, she fixates on Ames, who despite his aversion to flappers, finds her fascinating. The foursome depart the station for Isabel's home. (Curtain)

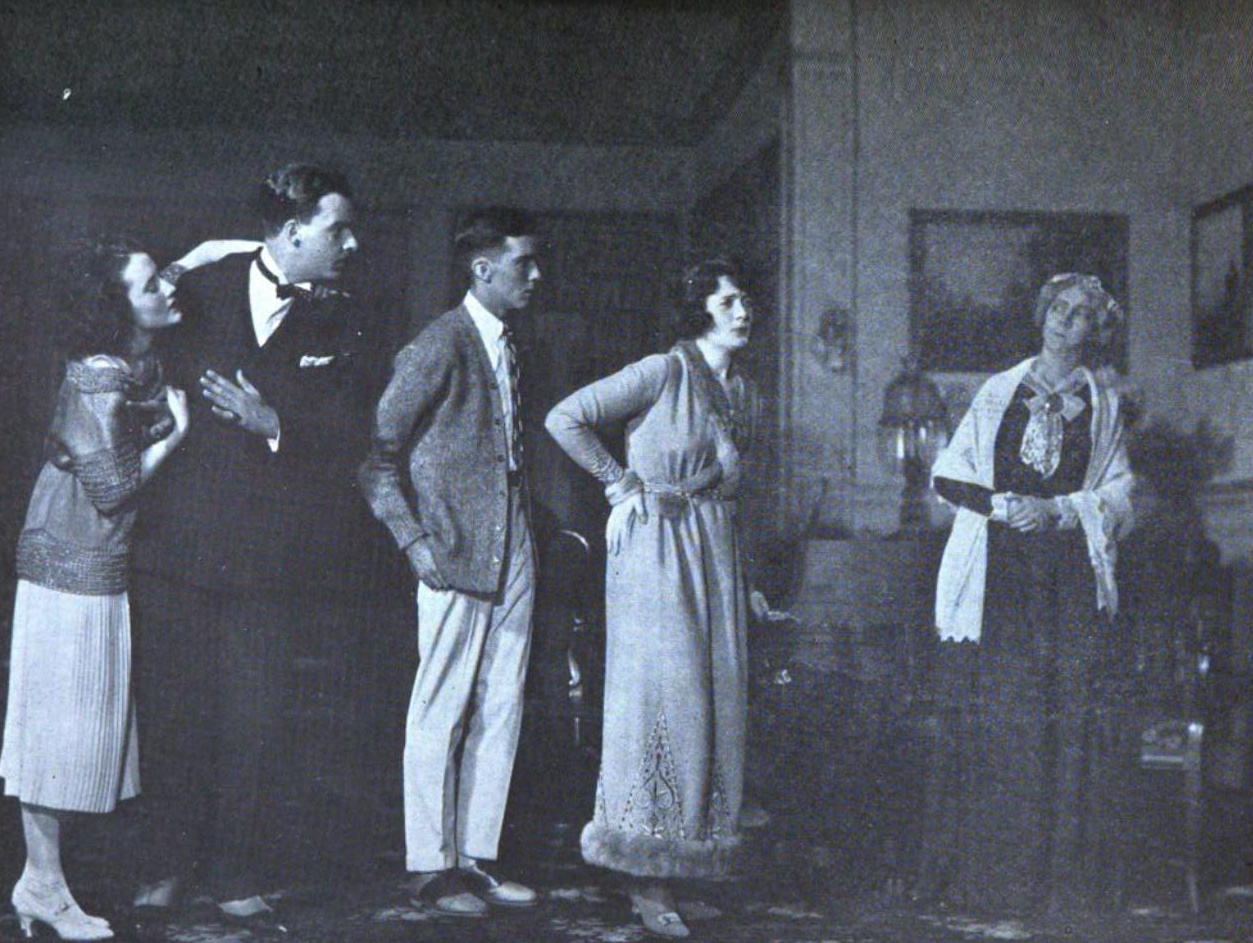

Act II (Living room of Isabel's farm home, the next morning.) Aunt Ellen questions Henry about everyone's whereabouts. Florence comes in from an early morning horseback ride, while Mattie announces Johnnie. Florence tries to get Ames to stay another day with a fake telegram scheme, while Isabel gives Johnnie some pointers on women. Florence maneuvers Ames into changing her slippers for tennis shoes, then leaves to play tennis with Johnnie. Isabel uses the break to buffalo Ames by showing him a lot of old family daguerrotypes and implying she knew the folks in them personally. Florence later asks Ames to put the slippers back on her. She then seizes Ames and makes him dance to music from a vocalion. (Note: This was a phonograph made by Aelion-Vocalion that played vocalion records.) But Johnnie has gotten wise, and when Isabel feigns a lame foot, he pointedly puts slippers on her feet. The scene ends as Florence whirls Ames, amazed that both he and Johnnie are so concerned about Isabel. (Note: Tarkington gave instructions in the published play that the curtain comes down on movement.) (Curtain)

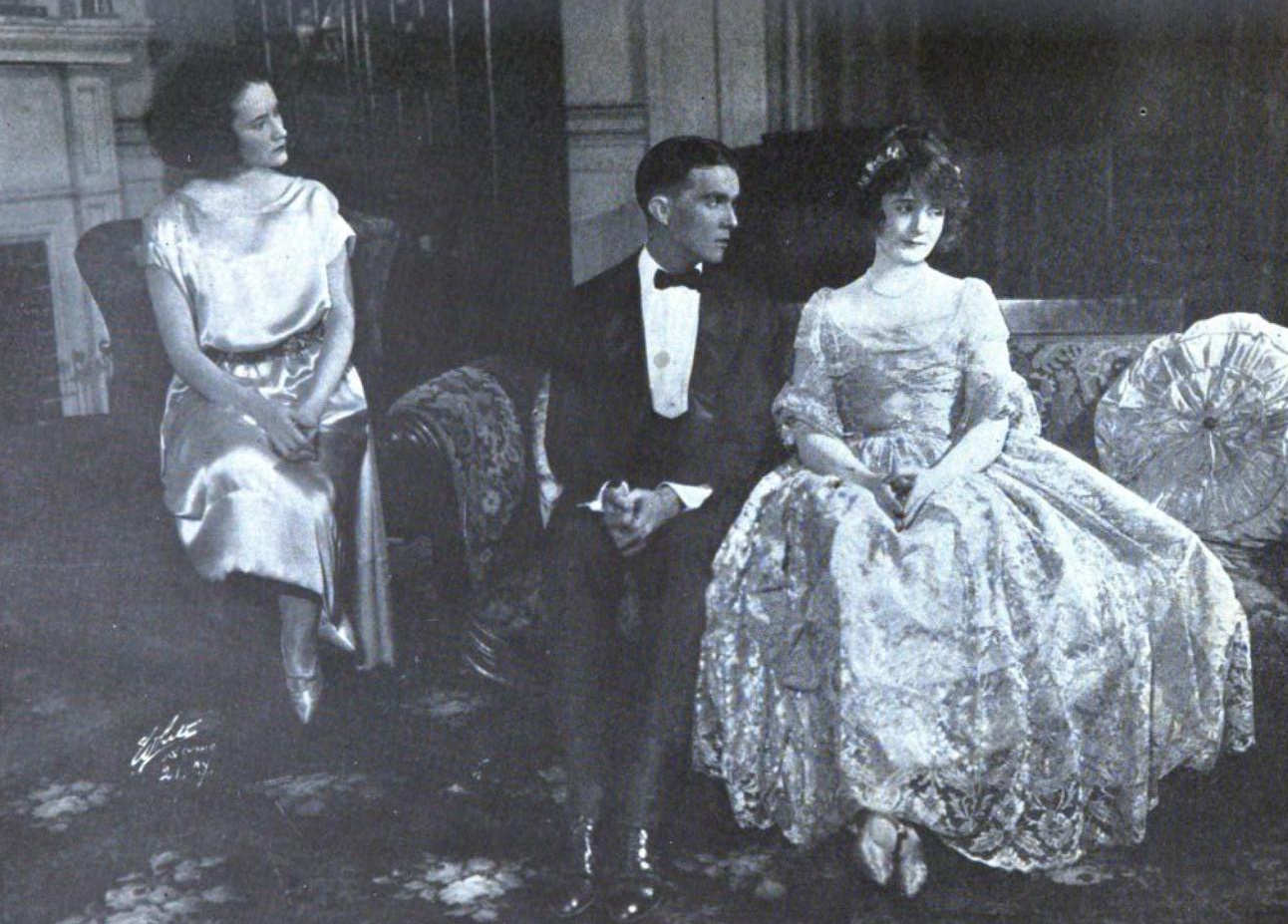

Act III (Same, late afternoon to early evening.) Mattie pretends to search for the family bible for Aunt Ellen, but Isabel had given her instructions not to find it. Mattie also wipes off the year on an inscription dedicating a cabinet to Isabel on her 15th birthday. Isabel enters and spars with Aunt Ellen over the missing bible, which has all of their birthdates in it. The latter leaves after being told another bible is upstairs. Ames wanders in from searching, having been primed by Mattie about the missing bible, but not where it can be found. Mattie also obligingly leaves ajar the cabinet door with the inscription inside. Isabel resumes her limp upon Ames' entrance, eventually drawing his attention to the antique cabinet, which she claims was new when given to her. Aunt Ellen plays a waltz on the piano, to which Johnnie and Isabel dance. When Ames comes in, he sweeps Isabel away from Johnnie, as Ellen continues playing. Ames accuses Isabel of mocking him, but she points to the family bible which she had brought into the room. It is open to the page that discloses her father married his second wife at age 65, after which Isabel was born. They are joined in the waltz by Johnnie and Florence, as Ames mutters to Isabel, "You infant". (Curtain)

== Original production ==
=== Background ===
Booth Tarkington originally wrote the play for Maude Adams' return to acting, but she changed her mind. The play was then recast with Billie Burke as the star. Burke at the time had been married to Florenz Ziegfeld for seven years; what part this played in the producers' decision to use her is unknown. Burke was a dozen years younger than Adams, so Tarkington did some rewriting before the tryout.

Tarkington was anxious to have Alfred Lunt for the male lead, as in Clarence. Lunt was under personal contract with George C. Tyler, who agreed to loan him for this production. Tyler was friends with Tarkington (Note: Tyler's 1934 memoir is dedicated to Tarkington, who also wrote the introduction for it.) and had good working relations with producer Abe Erlanger.

The play, its star, and its producers were first announced in late September 1921, though a title wasn't yet given. Rehearsals were to begin at the New Amsterdam Theatre in early October. By October 3, 1921, the title was given as The Intimate Strangers with Lunt and Glen Hunter as additional cast.

=== Cast ===
Cast during the Washington, D. C. tryout and the Broadway run.
Role	Actor	Dates	Notes and sources
William Ames	Alfred Lunt	Oct 31, 1921 - Jan 21, 1922	Newspaper cast lists and theater programs listed Lunt as appearing courtesy of George C. Tyler.
Isabel Stuart	Billie Burke	Oct 31, 1921 - Jan 21, 1922	This was her first stage appearance after several years of making silent films.
Florence	Frances Howard	Oct 31, 1921 - Jan 21, 1922	
Johnnie White	Glen Hunter	Oct 31, 1921 - Jan 21, 1922	
The Station Master	Charles Abbe	Oct 31, 1921 - Jan 21, 1922	
Aunt Ellen	Elizabeth Patterson	Oct 31, 1921 - Jan 21, 1922	
Henry	Frank J. Kirk	Oct 31, 1921 - Jan 21, 1922	
Mattie	Clare Weldon	Oct 31, 1921 - Jan 21, 1922	

=== Tryout ===
According to one account, Billie Burke had been asked by the producers where she would like the first performance to be held, and she replied "Why, my home town, Washington". The Intimate Strangers had a tryout at the National Theatre in Washington, D. C., on October 31, 1921. Burke had top billing, her name appearing in double-sized font above the title with no other performer listed. Nearly all reviewers mentioned how Burke seemed nervous at first, then recovered as the play continued. Burke later gave an interview in which she described having severe stage fright and feeling disorientated a few minutes after the play began.

=== Broadway premiere and reception ===
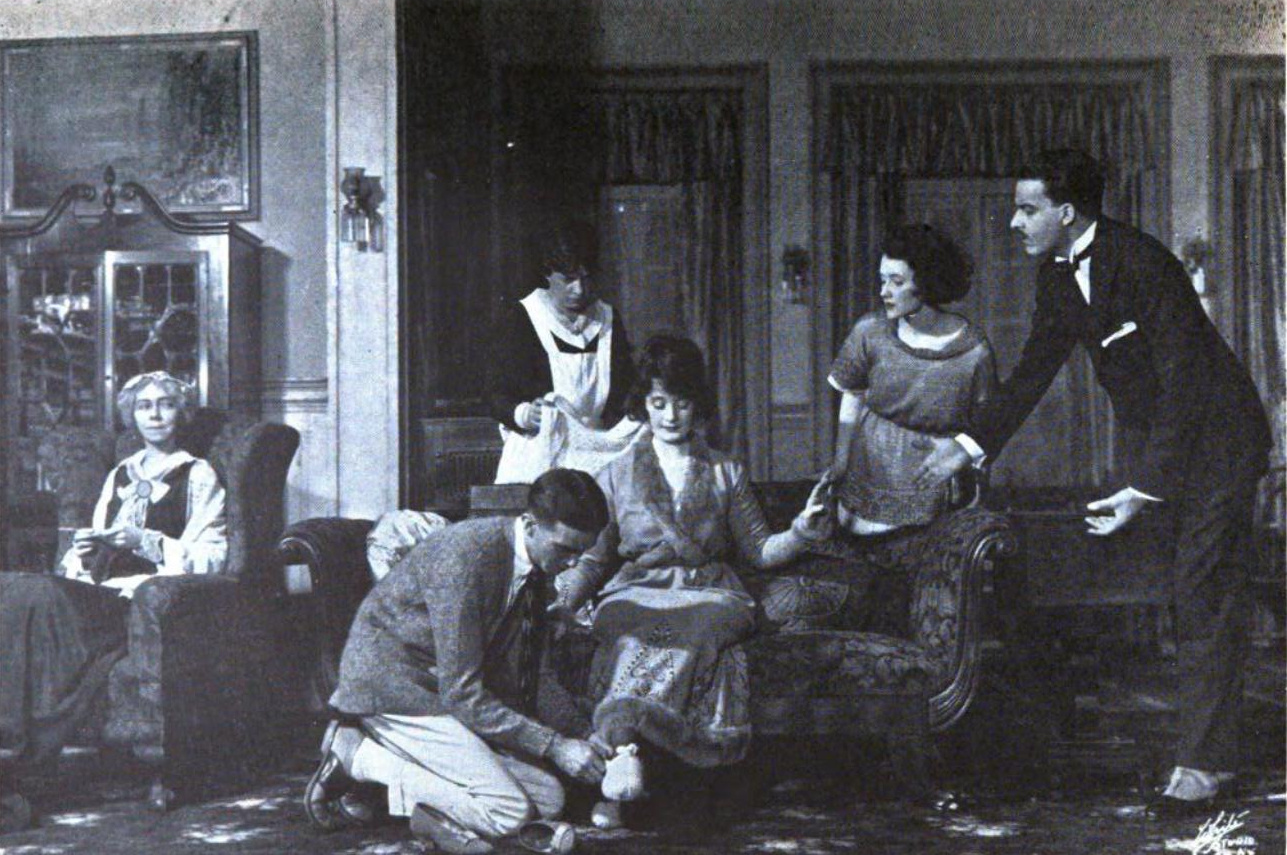

The production had its Broadway premiere on November 7, 1921, at Henry Miller's Theatre. Percy Hammond in the New-York Tribune thought it "a generous comedy", an "atonement" for Tarkington's The Wren, which despite Helen Hayes and Leslie Howard, had flopped the previous week. Alexander Woollcott said The Intimate Strangers "ranges from utterly charming to rather stupid". He felt the play didn't live up to the promise of the first act, and despite a good effort, Billie Burke was miscast for a role that required her to dampen her natural "Spring-like" personna. Woollcott felt Lunt had done well with an odd character, but gave Glen Hunter the highest performing marks.

Arthur Pollock also felt that Tarkington's writing lost its way in the second act, and the play as a whole had a labored feeling to it. He concurred that the best performance was that of Glen Hunter, Alfred Lunt being hampered by a role with little variety. James Whittaker in the New York Daily News said the play's appeal was limited to Burke's blue eyes, for the mystery of her character's age could hardly be considered a plot. He concluded by saying of Tarkington: "...as a playwright, he was once a good novelist".

The production had its fiftieth performance on December 21, 1921. At least two extra matinees were scheduled for Mondays, around the holiday season. An intercollegiate sorority of red-headed college girls elected Burke honorary chairman of their association, to which she responded with a block of free matinee tickets for their membership.

=== Broadway closing ===
The play closed at the Henry Miller's Theatre on January 21, 1922, after 91 performances. (Note: This includes eleven weeks with eight performances each, two extra holiday matinees on Mondays, and a Friday matinee during the final week.) It then went on tour, starting with the Broad Street Theatre in Philadelphia on January 23, 1922.

== Adaptations ==
=== Television ===
- "The Intimate Strangers" (1951) - Episode of Kraft Television Theatre, first broadcast over NBC on May 16, 1951, starring Peggy Conklin and Nelson Olmstead.

== Bibliography ==
- Booth Tarkington. The Intimate Strangers: A Comedy in Three Acts. Samuel French, 1921.
- George C. Tyler and J. C. Furnas. Whatever Goes Up. Bobbs Merrill, 1934.
