= Billie Burke =

American stage and film actress (1884–1970)

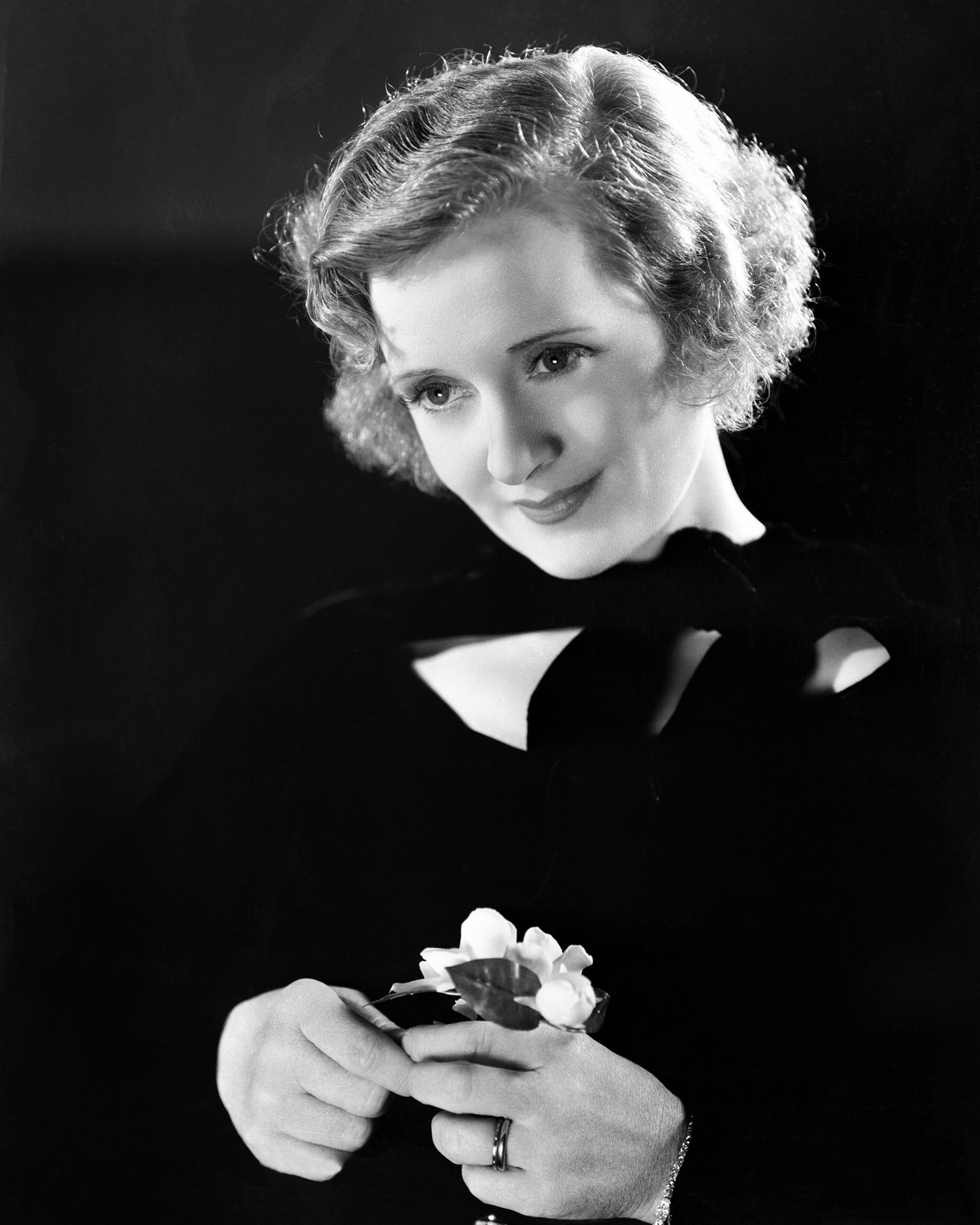
- Burke in 1933
- Born: Mary William Ethelbert Appleton Burke; August 7, 1884; Washington, D.C., U.S.
- Died: May 14, 1970 (aged 85); Los Angeles, California, U.S.
- Resting place: Kensico Cemetery
- Occupation: Actress
- Years active: 1903–1960
- Known for: Glinda the Good Witch in MGM's The Wizard of Oz (1939)
- Spouse: Florenz Ziegfeld Jr. (m. 1914; died 1932)
- Children: Patricia Ziegfeld Stephenson
- Awards: Hollywood Walk of Fame

Mary William Ethelbert Appleton "Billie" Burke (August 7, 1884 – May 14, 1970) was an American character actress who was famous on Broadway and radio, and in silent and sound films. She is perhaps best known to modern audiences as Glinda the Good Witch of the North in the Metro-Goldwyn-Mayer film musical The Wizard of Oz (1939).

Burke was nominated for the Academy Award for Best Supporting Actress for her performance as Emily Kilbourne in Merrily We Live (1938). She appeared in the Topper film series.

She was married to Broadway producer and impresario Florenz Ziegfeld Jr. from 1914 until his death in 1932.

== Early life ==
Burke was born in Washington, D.C., the daughter of Blanche (née Beatty) and her second husband, William "Billy" Ethelbert Burke. She toured the United States and Europe with her father, a singer and clown who worked for the Barnum & Bailey Circus. Her family settled in London where she attended plays in the West End. She began acting on stage in 1903, making her debut in London in The School Girl. Her other London shows included The Duchess of Dantzic (1903) and The Blue Moon (1904). She eventually returned to America to star in Broadway musical comedies.

== Career ==
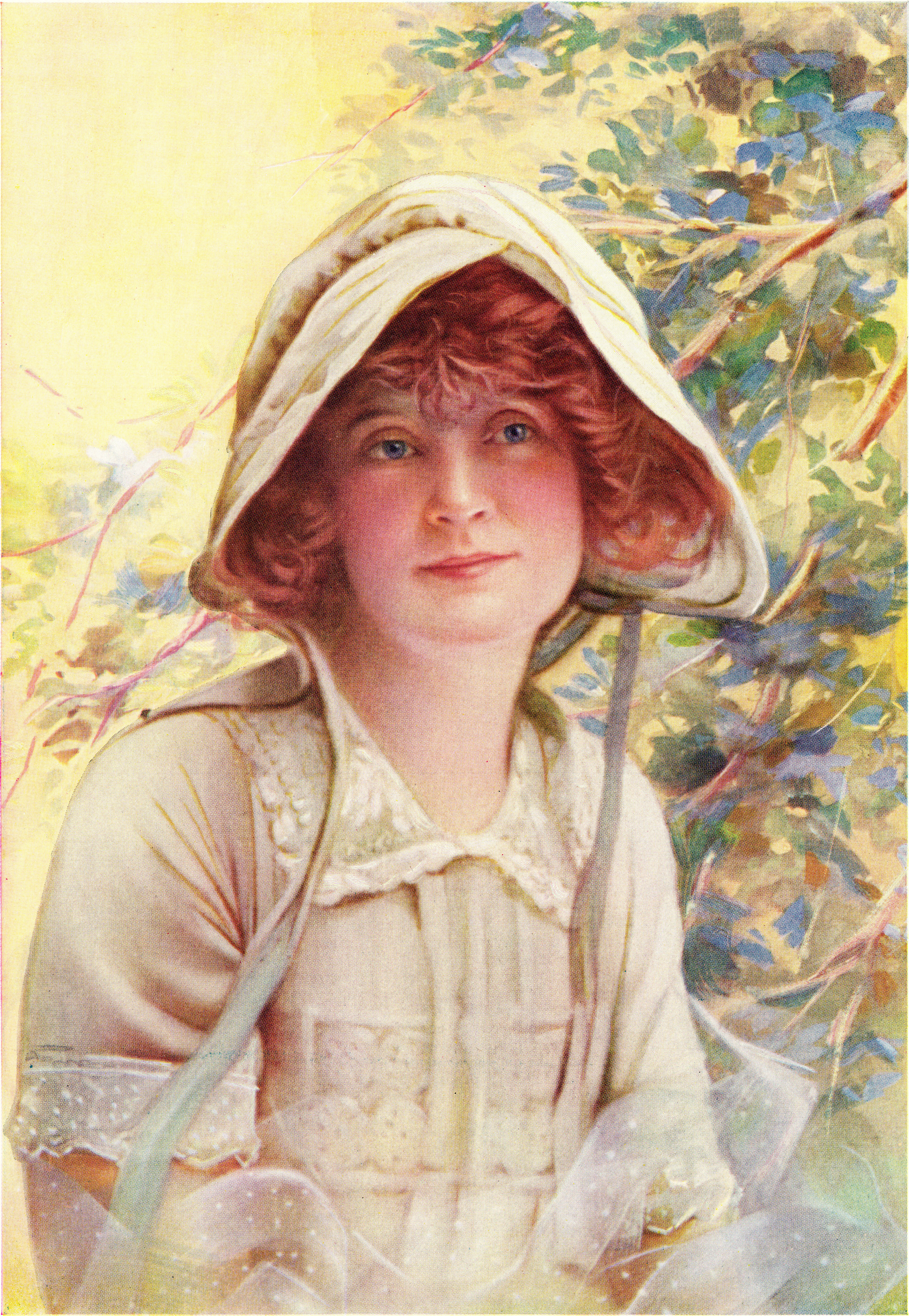
Burke in the Broadway production of Arthur Wing Pinero's The "Mind the Paint" Girl (1912)

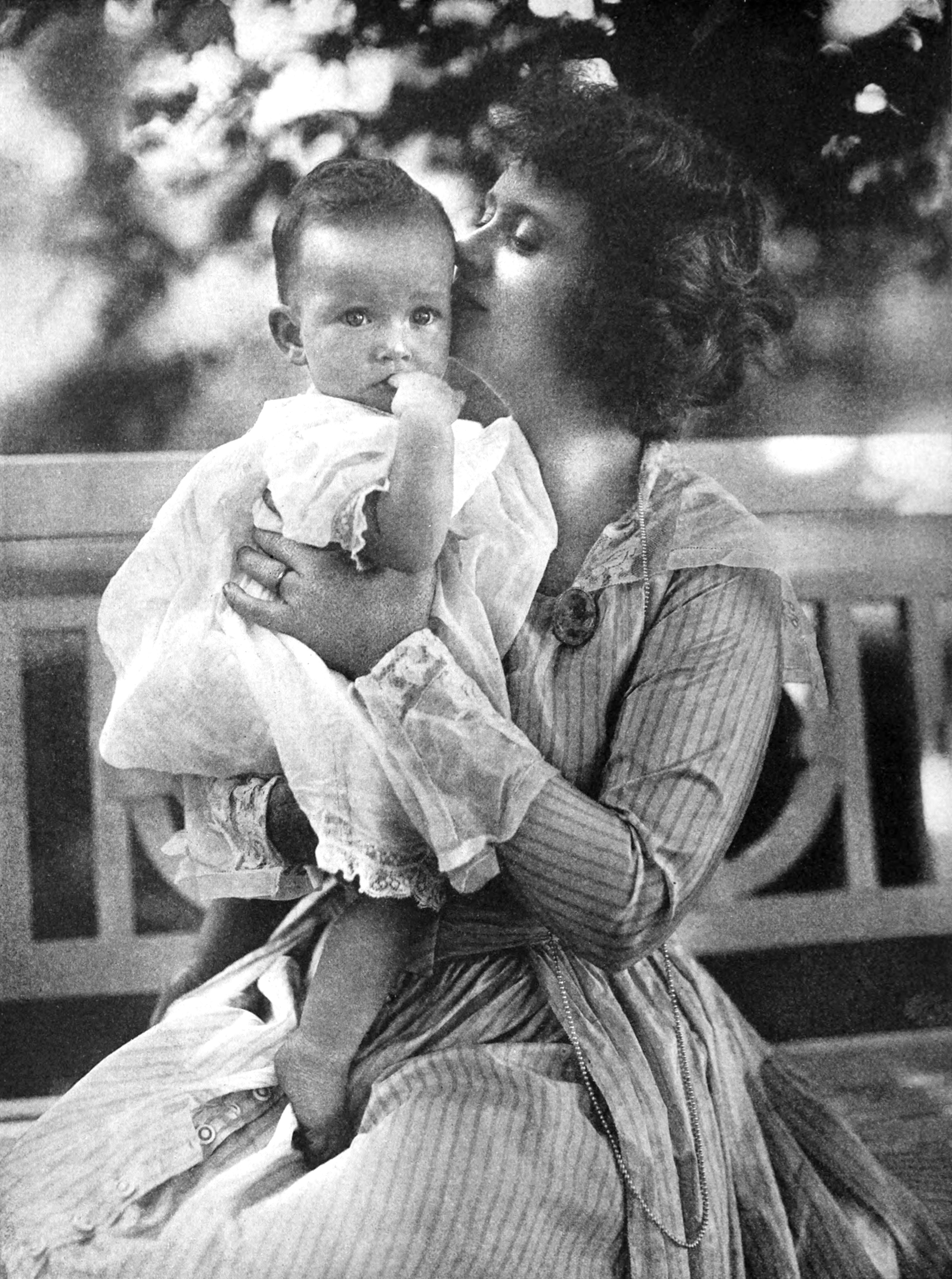
Burke with daughter Patricia (1917)

Burke went on to play leads on Broadway in Mrs. Dot, Suzanne, The Runaway, The "Mind the Paint" Girl, and The Land of Promise from 1910 to 1913, along with a supporting role in the revival of Sir Arthur Wing Pinero's The Amazons. There she met producer Florenz Ziegfeld Jr., marrying him in 1914. Two years later they had a daughter, author Patricia Ziegfeld Stephenson (1916–2008).

Burke was signed for the movies and made her cinematic debut in the title role of Peggy (1915). Her success was phenomenal, and she was soon earning what was reputedly the highest salary of any film actress up to that time. She followed her first feature with the 15-part serial Gloria's Romance (1916). By 1917, she was a favorite with silent-movie fans, rivaling Mary Pickford, Lillian Gish, Clara Kimball Young and Irene Castle. She starred primarily in provocative society dramas and comedies, similar in theme to The "Mind-the-Paint" Girl, her most successful American play. Her girlish charm rivaled her acting ability, and as she dressed to the hilt in fashionable gowns, furs and jewelry, her clothes sense also won her the devotion of female audiences. Among the films in which she appeared during this period were Arms and the Girl (1917), The Mysterious Miss Terry, Let's Get a Divorce (1918), Good Gracious, Annabelle (1919), Away Goes Prudence (1920) and The Frisky Mrs. Johnson (1920). As a nod to himself for his wife appearing for Zukor and Lasky, Ziegfeld insisted on promotions for each of the films to carry the tag "By Special Arrangement with Florenz Ziegfeld".

Burke's beauty and taste made her a major trendsetter throughout the 1910s and 20s. As early as 1907, following her Broadway debut performance in My Wife, department stores began carrying the "Billie Burke Dress" with a signature flat collar and lace trim. During this time, much of Burke's on- and off-screen wardrobe was provided by the leading European couturier Lucile (in private life, Lady Duff Gordon), whose New York branch was the fashion Mecca of socialites and entertainment celebrities. Burke reflected on her reputation as "a new kind of actress, carefree, and red-headed, and I had beautiful clothes."

In 1917, Burke endorsed Pond's Vanishing Cream.

Despite her success in film, Burke eventually returned to the stage, appearing in Caesar's Wife (1919), The Intimate Strangers (1921), The Marquise (1927) and The Happy Husband (1928).

When the family's investments were wiped out in the Wall Street Crash of 1929, Burke and her husband moved to the west coast so that Burke could resume screen acting to aid their debt.

Burke made her Hollywood comeback in 1932, when she starred as Margaret Fairfield in A Bill of Divorcement, which was directed by George Cukor. She played Katharine Hepburn's mother in the film, which was Hepburn's debut. Despite the death of her husband Florenz Ziegfeld during the film's production, she resumed acting shortly after his funeral.

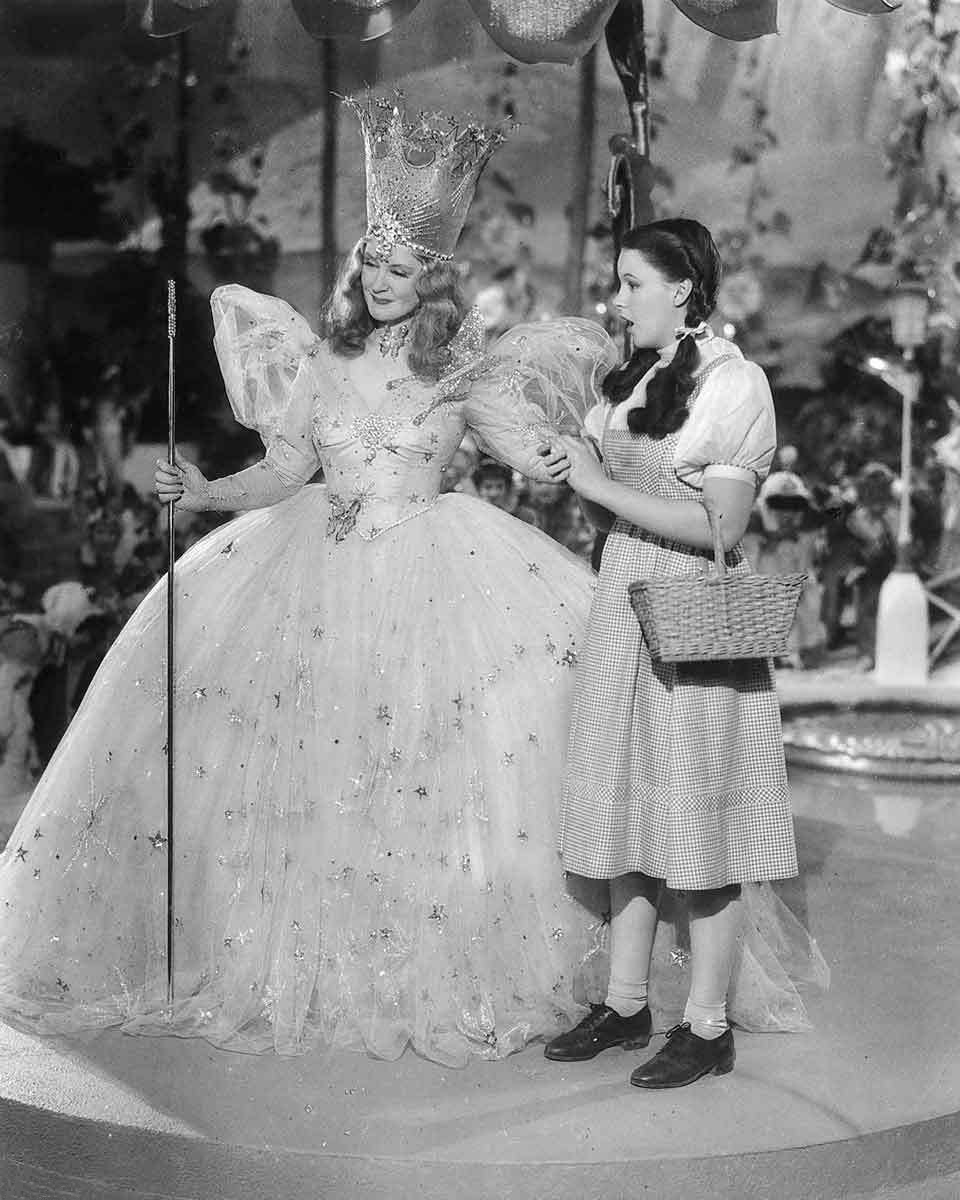
Burke as Glinda with Judy Garland as Dorothy Gale in The Wizard of Oz (1939)

In 1933, Burke was cast as Millicent Jordan, a dippy, high-society woman hosting a dinner party in the comedy Dinner at Eight, directed by George Cukor, co-starring with Lionel Barrymore, Marie Dressler, John Barrymore, Jean Harlow and Wallace Beery. The movie was a great success and revitalized Burke's career, typecasting her in many comedies and musicals as a ditzy, scatterbrained, upper-class matron, with her high-pitched voice.

In 1936, Metro-Goldwyn-Mayer filmed a biopic of Florenz Ziegfeld (The Great Ziegfeld), a film that won Academy Awards for Best Picture and Best Actress (Luise Rainer as Ziegfeld's common-law wife, Anna Held). William Powell played Ziegfeld and Myrna Loy played Burke; this infuriated Burke, who was under contract to the studio and believed she could have played herself. MGM, however, considered her too old to cast in the part of her younger self.

Burke appeared in Topper (1937) in which she played the twittering and puritanical Clara Topper, who is married to a man haunted by socialite ghosts played by Cary Grant and Constance Bennett. She returned to the role in the film's sequels. Her next performance as Emily Kilbourne in Merrily We Live (1938) resulted in her only Oscar nomination.

In 1938, she portrayed the unforgettable Glinda the Good Witch of the North in the musical The Wizard of Oz (1939), directed by Victor Fleming, starring Judy Garland. She had previously worked with Garland in the film Everybody Sing, in which she played Judy's histrionically hysterical actress-mother.

Director George Cukor offered Burke the role of Aunt Pittypat in Gone with the Wind (1939), but she declined it. Laura Hope Crews was given the role and Cukor instructed her to play it in a "Billie Burke-ish manner" with "the same zany feeling". Another successful film series followed with Father of the Bride (1950) and Father's Little Dividend (1951), both directed by Vincente Minnelli and starring Spencer Tracy, Joan Bennett, and Elizabeth Taylor. Burke also portrayed Mrs. Ernest (Daisy) Stanley in the 1942 film The Man Who Came to Dinner.

Burke wrote two autobiographies, both with Cameron Shipp, With a Feather on My Nose (Appleton 1949) and With Powder on My Nose (Coward McCann, 1959).

=== Radio and television ===
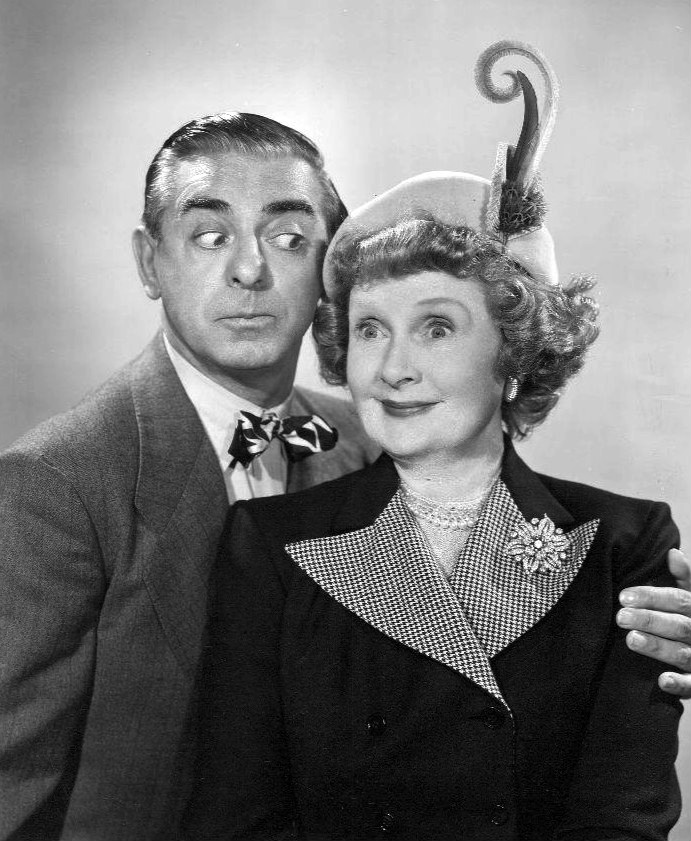
Burke joined the cast of Eddie Cantor's radio show in 1948

On CBS Radio, The Billie Burke Show was heard on Saturday mornings from April 3, 1943, until September 21, 1946. Sponsored by Listerine, this situation comedy was initially titled Fashions in Rations during its first year. Portraying herself as a featherbrained Good Samaritan who lived "in the little white house on Sunnyview Lane," she always offered a helping hand to those in her neighborhood. She worked often in early television, appearing in the short-lived sitcom Doc Corkle (1952). She was a guest star on several TV and radio series, including Duffy's Tavern.

On television, Burke starred in her own talk show, At Home with Billie Burke, which ran on the DuMont Television Network from June 1951 through the spring of 1952. She was one of the first female talk show hosts, after the hostesses of the earlier DuMont series And Everything Nice (1949–50) and Fashions on Parade (1948–49) which both include talk show segments.

Billie Burke starred in an adaptation of Dr. Heidegger's Experiment on the TV version of Lights Out on November 20, 1950.

=== Return to stage and final film ===
Burke attempted to make a comeback on the New York stage. She appeared in two short-lived productions: This Rock and Mrs. January and Mr. X. Although she received good reviews, the plays did not. She also acted in several plays in California, although by this time her memory was failing and she had difficulty remembering lines. In the late 1950s, her increasingly poor memory led to her retirement from acting, although her explanation at the time was, "Acting just wasn't any fun anymore."

Burke's final screen appearance was in Sergeant Rutledge (1960), a western, directed by John Ford.

== Personal life ==
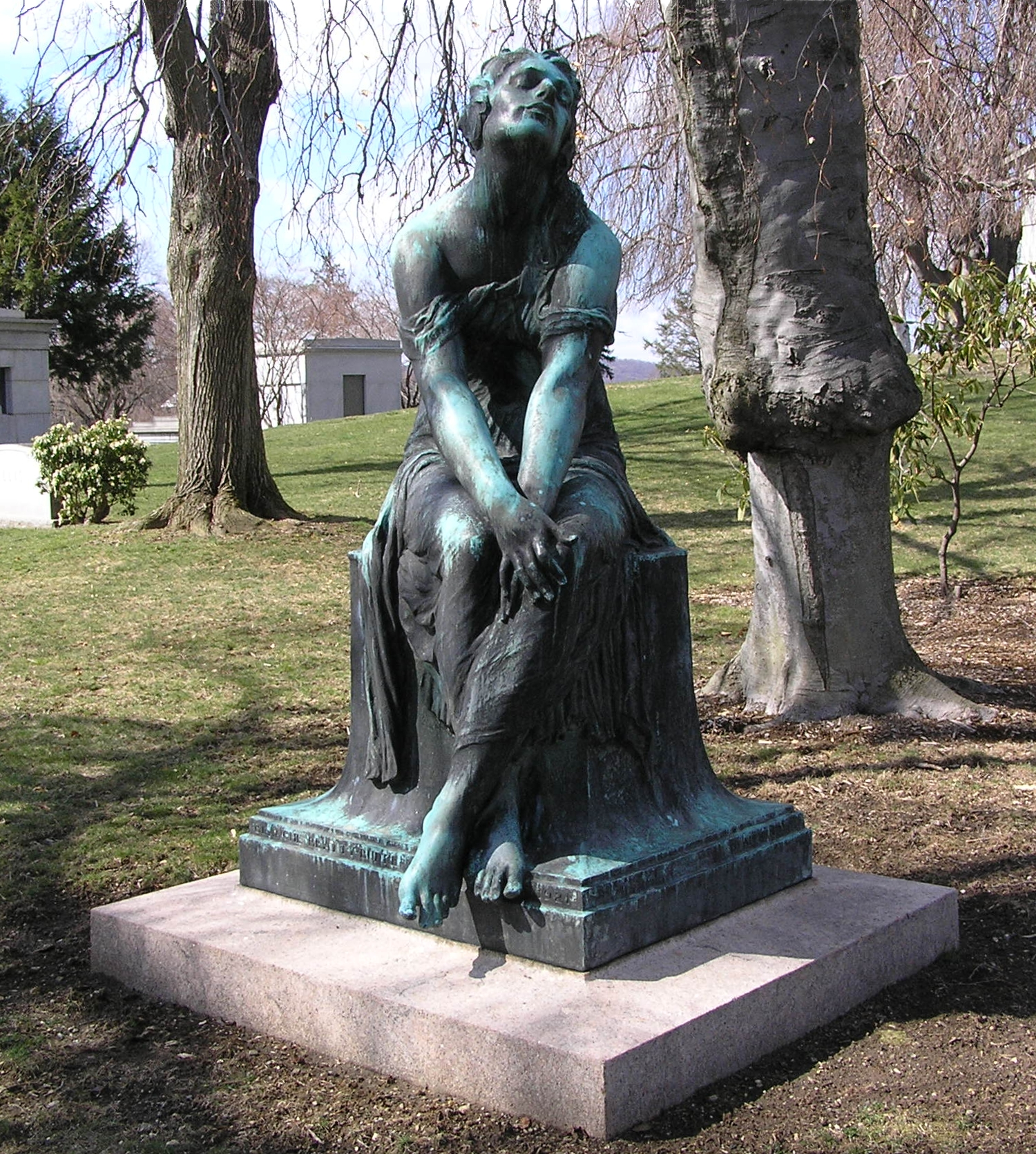
Memorial statue at Burke's grave in Kensico Cemetery

Among Burke's early suitors was the operatic tenor Enrico Caruso. According to Mark Twain biographers, she met the aging writer around 1907 and became a frequent visitor to his Manhattan townhouse, often invited to dine with the young members of Twain's Angel Fish and Aquarium Club for girls. Other famous men of letters who paid attention to her rising star included J.M. Barrie and W. Somerset Maugham.

In 1910, Burke bought the Kirkham estate on Broadway in Hastings-on-Hudson, New York, and renamed the mansion, Burkeley Crest.

In April 1914, Burke married Florenz Ziegfeld Jr. In 1916, Burke had a daughter, Patricia Burke Ziegfeld.

In 1921, Burke retired to raise her daughter Patricia, but resumed work after the Wall Street Crash of 1929.

In 1932, Burke moved from New York to Beverly Hills, California, after the death of Ziegfeld.

Burke died in Los Angeles of natural causes on May 14, 1970, at the age of 85, and she was interred beside Ziegfeld at Kensico Cemetery, Valhalla, Westchester County, New York.

== Legacy ==
For many years, Burke's framed photo was displayed above the exit staircase at New York City's Ziegfeld Theatre, but it disappeared after renovations. An opening-night program bearing a picture of her from her 1912 triumph The Mind the Paint Girl (Sir Arthur Wing Pinero) is displayed in the lobby of the Lyceum Theatre in Manhattan.

For her contributions to the film industry, Burke was inducted into the Hollywood Walk of Fame in 1960 with a motion pictures star at 6617 Hollywood Boulevard.

The Academy Film Archive houses the Florenz Ziegfeld-Billie Burke Collection, which consists primarily of home movies.

On November 4, 2015, the crater Burke, near the north pole of the planet Mercury, was named after Billie Burke.

Burke is referenced in the horror film The Exorcist III (1990). The character Kinderman says, "I have hobbies. In the meantime, we have cancer and mongoloid babies and murderers, monsters prowling the planet, even prowling this neighborhood, Father... right now, while our children suffer... and our loved ones die, and your God goes waltzing blithely through the universe like some kind of cosmic Billie Burke."

== Performance career ==
=== Radio ===
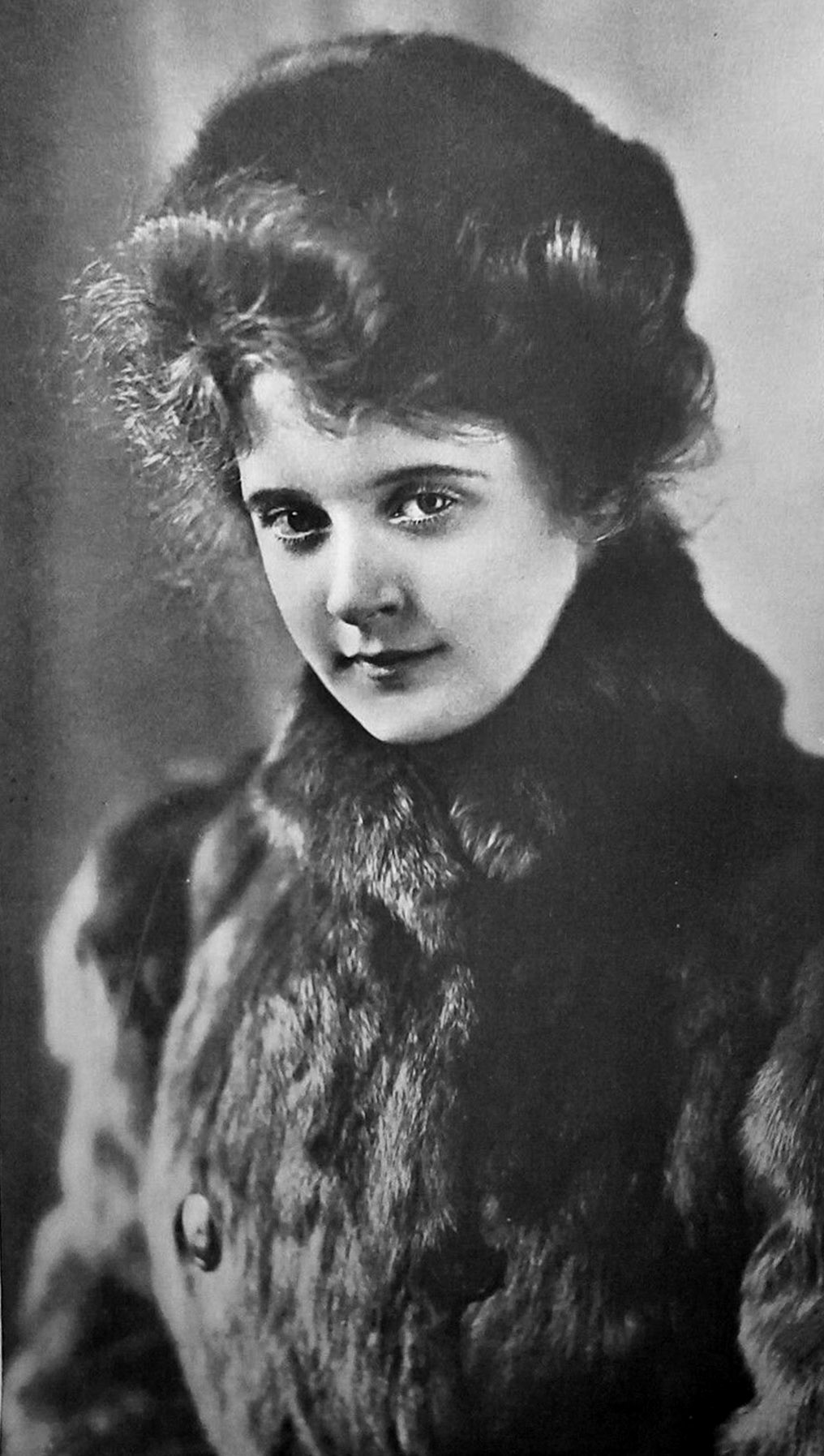
Burke early in her career c. 1908

- The Ziegfeld Follies of the Air – 1932
- Doubting Thomas – 1935
- Good News of 1939 – 1938
- The Rudy Vallee Hour – 1939
- The Gulf Screen Guild Theater – 1939
- The Rudy Vallee Sealtest Show – 1940–41
- The Pepsodent Show – 1941
- The Billie Burke Show – 1943–1946
- Duffy's Tavern – 1944
- The Sealtest Village Store – 1944
- Mail Call – 1944
- The Charlie McCarthy Show – 1944–47
- Tribute to Ethel Barrymore – 1945
- The Rudy Vallee Show – 1945
- Show Stoppers – 1946
- The Danny Kaye Show – 1946
- WOR 25th Anniversary – 1947
- Your Movietown Radio Theatre – 1948
- The Eddie Cantor Pabst Blue Ribbon Show – 1948
- Family Theater – 1948–52
- This Is Show Business – CBS-TV, 1949
- The Martin and Lewis Show – 1949
- The Bill Stern Colgate Sports Newsreel – 1949
- Stagestruck – 1954
- Biography in Sound – 1955–56

=== Broadway ===
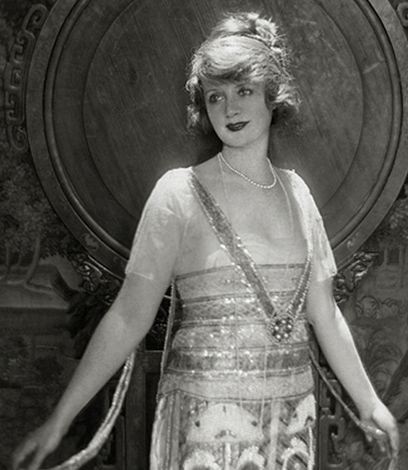
Burke in the February 1920 issue of Vanity Fair in a portrait by Adolf de Meyer

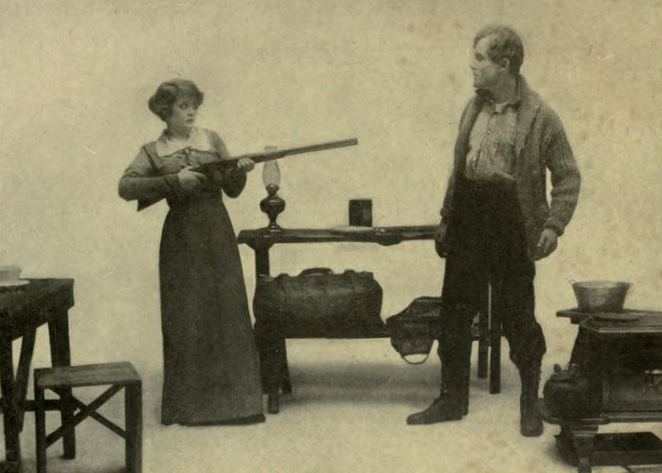
Burke with Shelley Hull in The Land of Promise, 1913.

- My Wife – 1907
- Love Watches – 1908
- Mrs. Dot – 1910
- Suzanne – 1910
- The Philosopher in the Apple Orchard – 1911
- The Runaway – 1911
- The Amazons – 1913
- The Land of Promise – 1913
- Jerry – 1914
- The Rescuing Angel – 1917
- A Marriage of Convenience – 1918
- Caesar's Wife – 1919
- The Intimate Strangers – 1921
- Rose Briar – 1922
- Annie Dear – 1924
- The Marquise – 1927
- The Happy Husband – 1928
- Family Affairs – 1929
- The Truth Game – 1930
- Ziegfeld Follies of 1934 – 1934 (producer)
- Ziegfeld Follies of 1936 – 1936 (producer)
- This Rock – 1943
- Ziegfeld Follies of 1943 – 1943 (producer)
- Mrs. January and Mr. X – 1944

=== Filmography ===
==== Silent ====
Year	Title	Role	Notes
1914	Our Mutual Girl	Herself	Lost film
1916	Peggy	Peggy Cameron	
1916	Gloria's Romance	Gloria Stafford	Lost film
1917	The Mysterious Miss Terry	Mavis Terry	Lost film
1917	Arms and the Girl	Ruth Sherwood	
1917	The Land of Promise	Nora Marsh	Lost film
1918	Eve's Daughter	Irene Simpson-Bates	Lost film
1918	Let's Get a Divorce	Mme. Cyprienne Marcey	Lost film
1918	In Pursuit of Polly	Polly Marsden	Lost film
1918	The Make-Believe Wife	Phyllis Ashbrook	Lost film
1919	Good Gracious, Annabelle	Annabelle Leigh	Lost film
1919	The Misleading Widow	Betty Taradine	Lost film
1919	Sadie Love	Sadie Love	Lost film
1919	Wanted: A Husband	Amanda Darcy Cole	Lost film
1920	Away Goes Prudence	Prudence Thorne	Lost film
1920	The Frisky Mrs. Johnson	Belle Johnson	Lost film
1921	The Education of Elizabeth	Elizabeth Banks	Lost film

==== Sound ====
Year	Title	Role	Notes
1929	Glorifying the American Girl	Herself	Uncredited
1932	A Bill of Divorcement	Margaret	
1933	Christopher Strong	Lady Elaine Strong	
1933	Dinner at Eight	Millicent Jordan	
1933	Only Yesterday	Julia Warren	
1934	Where Sinners Meet	Eustasia	
1934	Finishing School	Mrs. Helen Crawford Radcliff	
1934	We're Rich Again	Linda Page	
1934	Forsaking All Others	Aunt Paula	
1935	Society Doctor	Mrs. Crane	
1935	After Office Hours	Mrs. Norwood	
1935	Becky Sharp	Lady Bareacres	
1935	Doubting Thomas	Paula Brown	
1935	She Couldn't Take It	Mrs. Daniel Van Dyke	
1935	A Feather in Her Hat	Julia Trent Anders	
1935	Splendor	Clarissa	
1936	My American Wife	Mrs. Robert Cantillon	
1936	Piccadilly Jim	Eugenia Willis, Nesta's Sister	
1936	Craig's Wife	Mrs. Frazier	
1937	Parnell	Clara	
1937	Topper	Mrs. Topper	
1937	The Bride Wore Red	Contessa di Meina	
1937	Navy Blue and Gold	Mrs. Alyce Gates	
1938	Everybody Sing	Diana Bellaire	
1938	Merrily We Live	Mrs. Kilbourne	
1938	The Young in Heart	Marmy Carleton	
1938	Topper Takes a Trip	Mrs. Topper	
1939	Zenobia	Mrs. Tibbett	
1939	Bridal Suite	Mrs. McGill	
1939	The Wizard of Oz	Glinda	
1939	Eternally Yours	Aunt Abby	
1939	Remember?	Louise Bronson	
1940	The Ghost Comes Home	Cora Adams	
1940	And One Was Beautiful	Mrs. Lattimer	
1940	Irene	Mrs. Vincent	
1940	The Captain Is a Lady	Blossy Stort	
1940	Dulcy	Eleanor Forbes	
1940	Hullabaloo	Penny Merriweather	
1941	The Wild Man of Borneo	Bernice Marshall	
1941	Topper Returns	Mrs. Clara Topper	
1941	One Night in Lisbon	Catherine Enfilden	
1942	The Man Who Came to Dinner	Mrs. Daisy Stanley	
1942	What's Cookin'?	Agatha Courtney	
1942	In This Our Life	Lavinia Timberlake	
1942	They All Kissed the Bride	Mrs. Drew	
1942	Girl Trouble	Mrs. Rowland	
1943	Hi Diddle Diddle	Liza Prescott	
1943	So's Your Uncle	Aunt Minerva	
1943	You're a Lucky Fellow, Mr. Smith	Aunt Harriet Crandall	
1943	Gildersleeve on Broadway	Mrs. Laura Chandler	
1945	Swing Out, Sister	Jessica Mariman	
1945	The Cheaters	Clara Pidgeon	
1946	Breakfast in Hollywood	Mrs. Frances Cartwright	
1946	The Bachelor's Daughters	Molly Burns	
1948	Billie Gets Her Man	Billie Baxter	Short film
1949	The Barkleys of Broadway	Mrs. Livingston Belney	
1949	And Baby Makes Three	Mrs. Marvin Fletcher	
1950	The Boy from Indiana	Zelda Bagley	
1950	Father of the Bride	Doris Dunstan	
1950	Three Husbands	Mrs. Jenny Bard Whittaker	
1951	Father's Little Dividend	Doris Dunstan	
1953	Small Town Girl	Mrs. Livingston	
1959	The Young Philadelphians	Mrs. J. Arthur Allen	
1960	Sergeant Rutledge	Mrs. Cordelia Fosgate	
1960	Pepe	Herself	

== See also ==
- Academy of Music/Riviera Theatre
- List of actors with Academy Award nominations
