= Patricia Ziegfeld Stephenson =

American author (1916-2008)

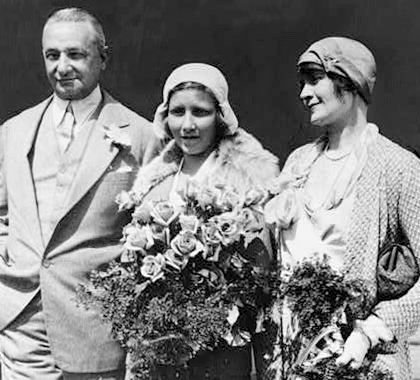
- Patricia Ziegfeld (center) with her parents in 1930
- Born: Patricia Burke Ziegfeld; October 23, 1916; New York City, U.S.
- Died: April 11, 2008 (aged 91); Los Angeles, California, U.S.
- Occupation: Author
- Spouse: William Robert Stephenson (m. 1939; died 2007)
- Children: 4
- Parent(s): Florenz Ziegfeld; Billie Burke

Patricia Burke Ziegfeld Stephenson (October 23, 1916 – April 11, 2008) was an American author. She was known for her 1963 autobiography The Ziegfelds' Girl: Confessions of an Abnormally Happy Childhood. Born in New York City, she spent her early years in Hastings-on-Hudson, New York, later moving to California where she lived until her death at age 91.

== Early life and education ==
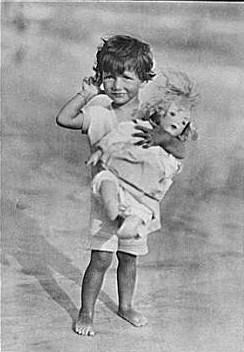
Portrait photograph of Patricia Ziegfeld, 1919

Patricia Ziegfeld was born in New York City in 1916 to Florenz Ziegfeld, a Broadway impresario, and Billie Burke, an actress best known for playing Glinda the Good Witch in The Wizard of Oz. She grew up in Hastings-on-Hudson in Westchester County, New York. She also lived at the family's home in Palm Beach, Florida.

Her father died in 1932 and she moved to California with her mother. She attended UCLA then did some acting and writing for newspapers.

== Adulthood ==
She married William Robert Stephenson, Sr. (1912–2007) on June 11, 1939. She had met Stephenson while he was working as a dance instructor at the Beverly Hills Hotel. He designed homes, including the General Electric show home for Ronald Reagan and Nancy Reagan. They had four children: Cecilia Duncan Stephenson (born 1942), Florenz Crossley Stephenson, Susan Plemons Stephenson (1950–2021), and William Robert Stephenson, Jr (born 1947).

In 1963, she published an autobiography, The Ziegfelds' Girl: Confessions of an Abnormally Happy Childhood. She also wrote the introduction for a biography of her father, The Ziegfeld Touch: The Life and Times of Florenz Ziegfeld, Jr., which was written by her cousins, Richard and Paulette Ziegfeld.

She died of congestive heart failure at her home in Los Angeles at the age of 91. She had nine grandchildren and three great-grandchildren, at the time of her death.
