= The Billie Burke Show =

1943-1946 old-time radio situation comedy

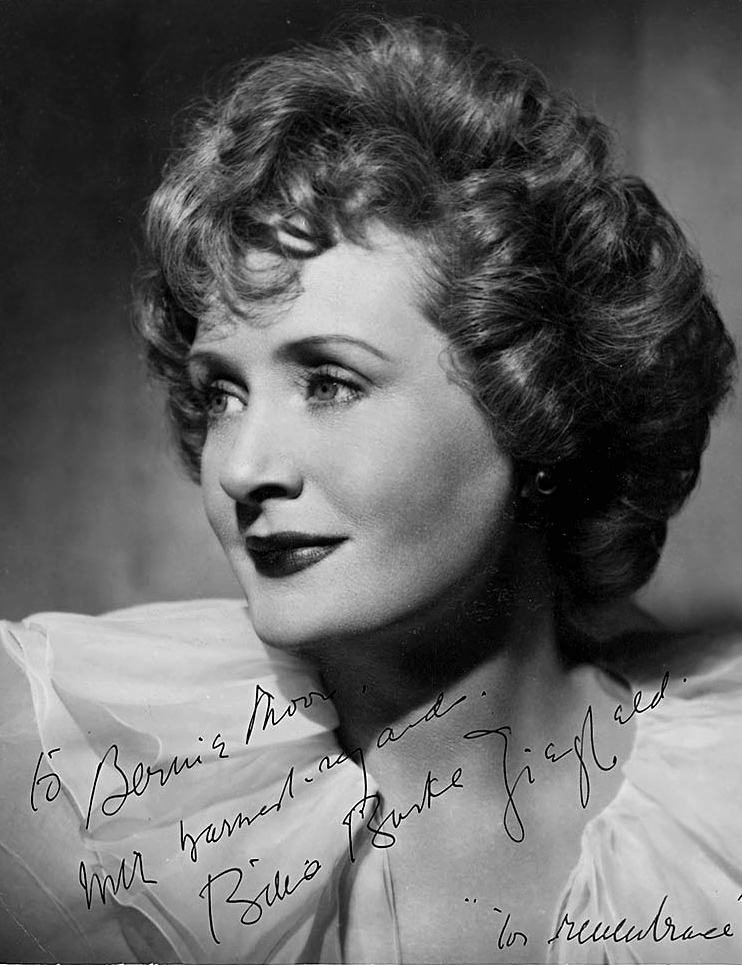
- Billie Burke (circa 1943)
- Running time: 30 minutes
- Country of origin: United States
- Language(s): English
- Syndicates: CBS
- Starring: Billie Burke
- Announcer: Marvin Miller; Tom Dixon
- Directed by: Axel Gruenberg; Dave Titus
- Produced by: Axel Gruenberg; Dave Titus
- Original release: April 3, 1943 – September 21, 1946
- Opening theme: Look for the Silver Lining
- Sponsored by: Listerine toothpaste

The Billie Burke Show was an old-time radio situation comedy in the United States. It was broadcast on CBS April 3, 1943 - September 21, 1946.

== Format ==
Actress Billie Burke played herself as "a well-meaning young woman with her head in the clouds." The character went out of her way to help people, from hobos in need to children wanting a playground, "becoming involved in comic situations as a result.

Grant Hayter-Menzies wrote in his book, Mrs. Ziegfeld: The Public and Private Lives of Billie Burke: "The Billie Burke Show ... was a showcase for the blithery character Billie now personified on the screen. To make her more palatable to a wider audience, she was reconfigured from ditzy society matron to ditzy small town spinster 'in the little white house on Sunnyview Drive.'"

== Personnel ==
In addition to Burke, regular cast members were Earle Ross as Burke's brother, Julius, Lillian Randolph as the housekeeper, Daisy, and Marvin Miller as both of Burke's suitors, Colonel Fitts and Banker Guthrie. Miller also was one of the program's announcers, as was Tom Dixon. Producer-directors were Axel Gruenberg and Dave Titus. Writers were Paul West and Ruth Brooks.

In his book, Hayter-Menzies cited an uncredited source, actress and writer Nancy Hamilton, for some of Burke's success in the program. Referring to a letter that Burke wrote to Hamilton in July 1944, he wrote, "While she [Hamilton] is not credited as such, according to various hints dropped in this letter and succeeding ones, Hamilton wrote — officially or not — lines for Billie to use in her show, and Billie considered them the best she'd had."
