= Florenz Ziegfeld Jr. =

American theatrical impresario (1867–1932)

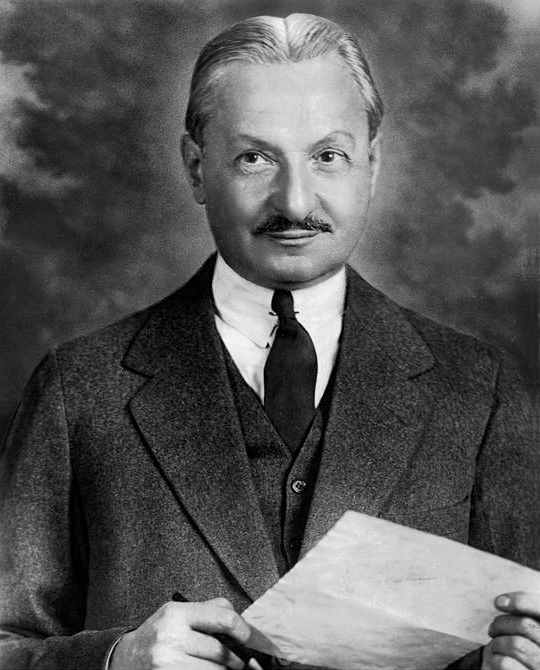
- Ziegfeld in 1928
- Born: Florenz Edward Ziegfeld Jr. March 21, 1867; Chicago, Illinois U.S.
- Died: July 22, 1932 (aged 65); Hollywood, California U.S.
- Occupations: Impresario; producer
- Years active: 1893–1932
- Spouses: Anna Held (m. 1897; div. 1913); Billie Burke (m. 1914)
- Children: Patricia Ziegfeld Stephenson

Florenz Edward Ziegfeld Jr. (/ˈzɪɡfɛld/; March 21, 1867 – July 22, 1932) was an American Broadway impresario, notable for his series of theatrical revues, the Ziegfeld Follies (1907–1931), inspired by the Folies Bergère of Paris. He also produced the musical Show Boat. He was known as the "glorifier of the American girl". Ziegfeld is a member of the American Theater Hall of Fame.

== Early life ==
Florenz Edward Ziegfeld Jr. was born on March 21, 1867, in Chicago, Illinois. His mother, Rosalie (née de Hez), who was born in Belgium, was the grandniece of General Count Étienne Maurice Gérard. His father, Florenz Edward Ziegfeld, was a German immigrant whose father was the mayor of Jever in Friesland. Ziegfeld was baptized in his mother's Roman Catholic church. His father was Lutheran. As a child Ziegfeld witnessed the Chicago fire of 1871.

== Career ==
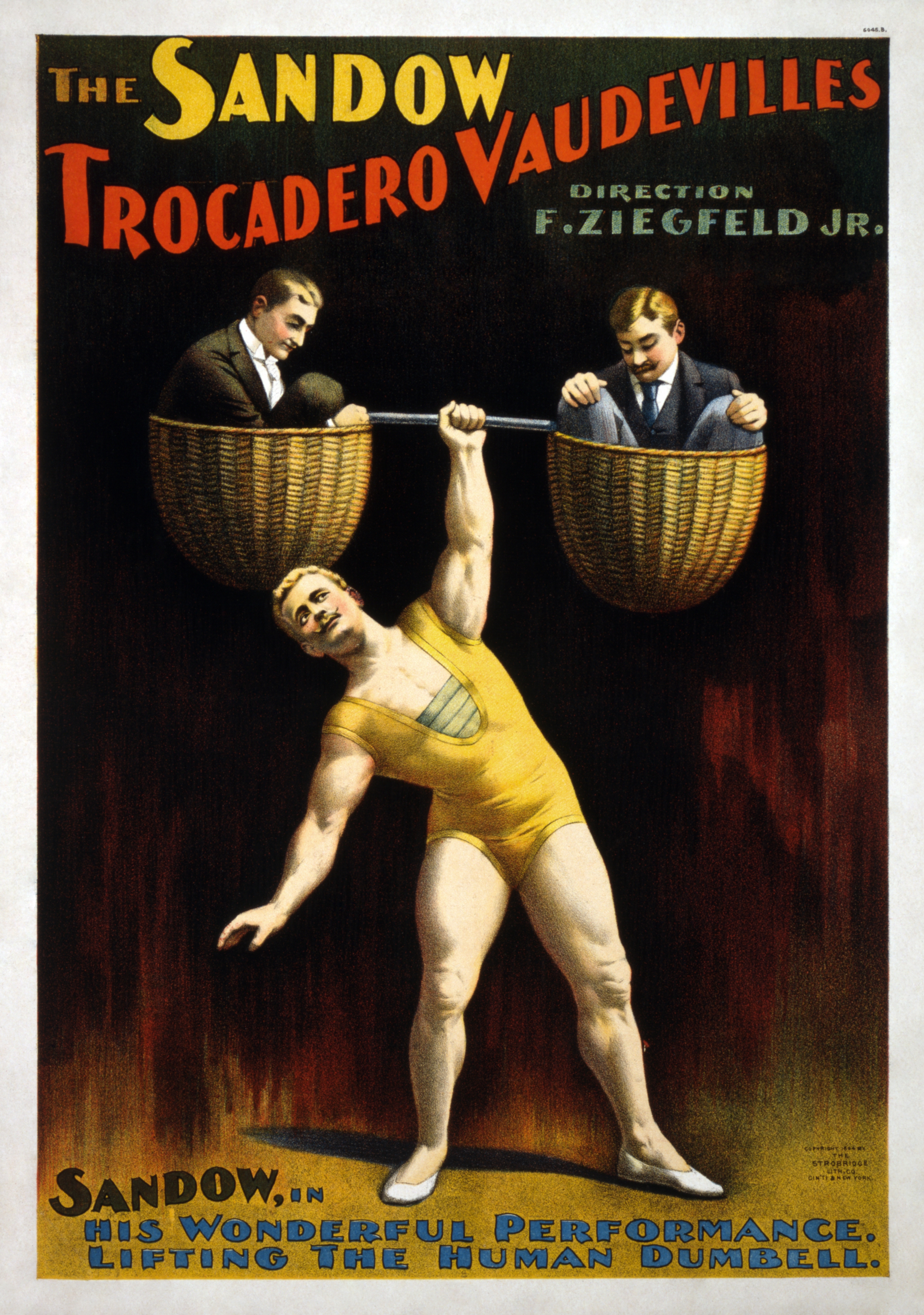
The Sandow Trocadero Vaudevilles (poster), produced by Ziegfeld, (1894)

His father ran the Chicago Musical College and later opened a nightclub, the Trocadero, to profit from the 1893 World's Fair. To help his father's nightclub succeed, Ziegfeld hired and managed the strongman Eugen Sandow.

In London, during a trip to Europe, Ziegfeld met Anna Held, a Polish-French singer of Jewish descent. His promotion of Held in America brought about her meteoric rise to national fame. It was Held who first suggested an American imitation of the Parisian Folies Bergère to Ziegfeld. Her success in a series of his Broadway shows, especially A Parisian Model (1906), was a major reason for his starting a series of lavish revues in 1907. Much of Held's popularity was due to Ziegfeld's creation of publicity stunts and rumors fed to the American press.

Ziegfeld's stage spectaculars, known as the Ziegfeld Follies, began with Follies of 1907, which opened on July 7, 1907, and were produced annually until 1931. These extravaganzas, with elaborate costumes and sets, featured beauties chosen personally by Ziegfeld in production numbers choreographed to the works of prominent composers such as Irving Berlin, George Gershwin and Jerome Kern. The Follies featured the famous Ziegfeld girls, female chorus dancers who wore elaborate costumes and performed in synchronization.

The Follies featured many performers who, though well known from previous work in other theatrical genres, achieved unique financial success and publicity with Ziegfeld. Included among these are Nora Bayes, Fanny Brice, Ruth Etting, W. C. Fields, Eddie Cantor, Marilyn Miller, Will Rogers, Bert Williams and Ann Pennington.

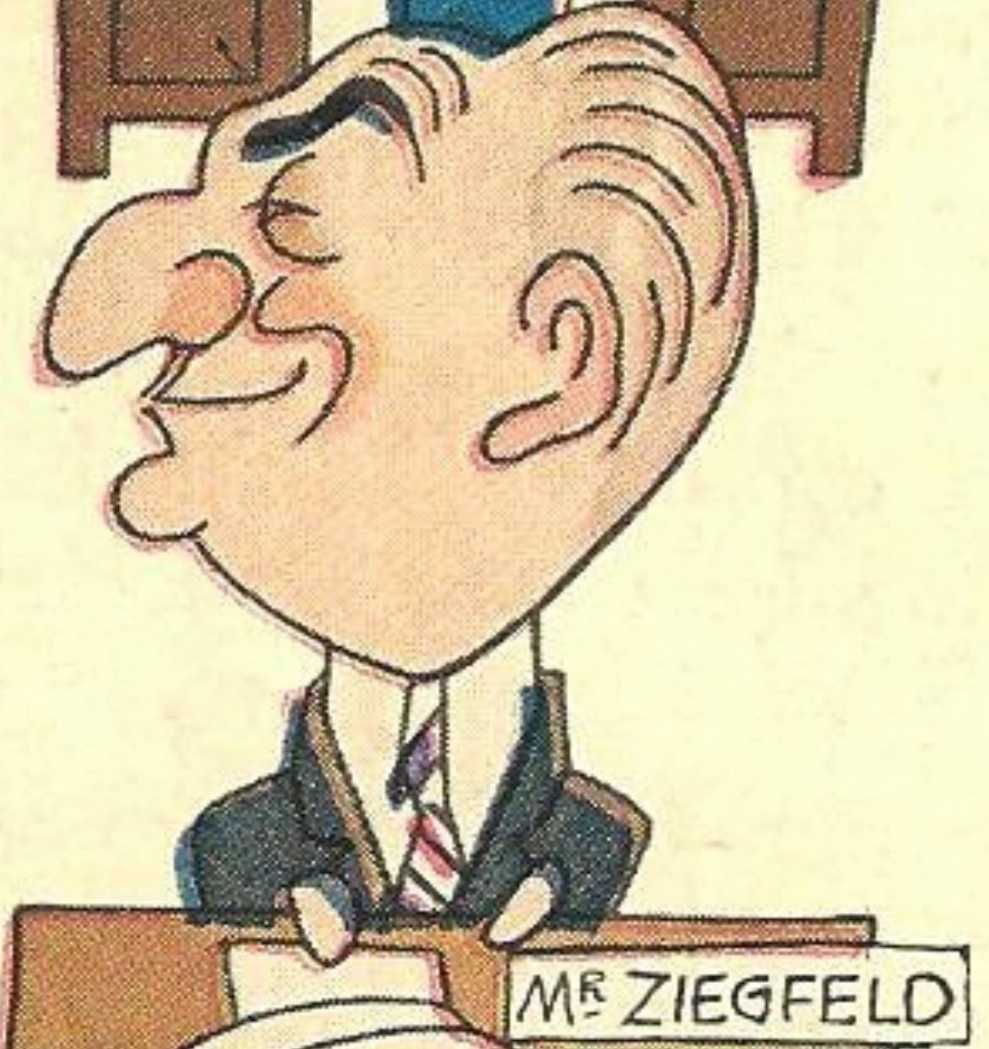
Caricature by Ralph Barton, 1925

At a cost of $2.5 million, Ziegfeld built the 1600-seat Ziegfeld Theatre on the west side of Sixth Avenue between 54th and 55th Streets. Designed by Joseph Urban and Thomas W. Lamb, the auditorium was egg-shaped, with the stage at the narrow end. A huge medieval-style mural, The Joy of Life, covered the walls and ceiling. To finance the construction, Ziegfeld borrowed from William Randolph Hearst, who took control of the theater after Ziegfeld's death.

The Ziegfeld Theatre opened in February 1927 with Ziegfeld's production of Rio Rita, which ran for nearly 500 performances. This was followed by Show Boat, a great hit with a run of 572 performances. This musical, which concerned racial discrimination in the South during the late nineteenth century, was a collaboration between Ziegfeld, Urban, and composer Jerome Kern. The musical has been revived four times on Broadway, winning multiple Tony Awards. The score features several classics such as "Ol' Man River" and "Can't Help Lovin' Dat Man".

Ziegfeld lost much of his money in the stock market crash. In May 1932 he staged a revival of Show Boat that ran for six months—a hit, by Depression standards. That same year, he brought his Follies stars to CBS Radio with The Ziegfeld Follies of the Air.

== Personal life ==
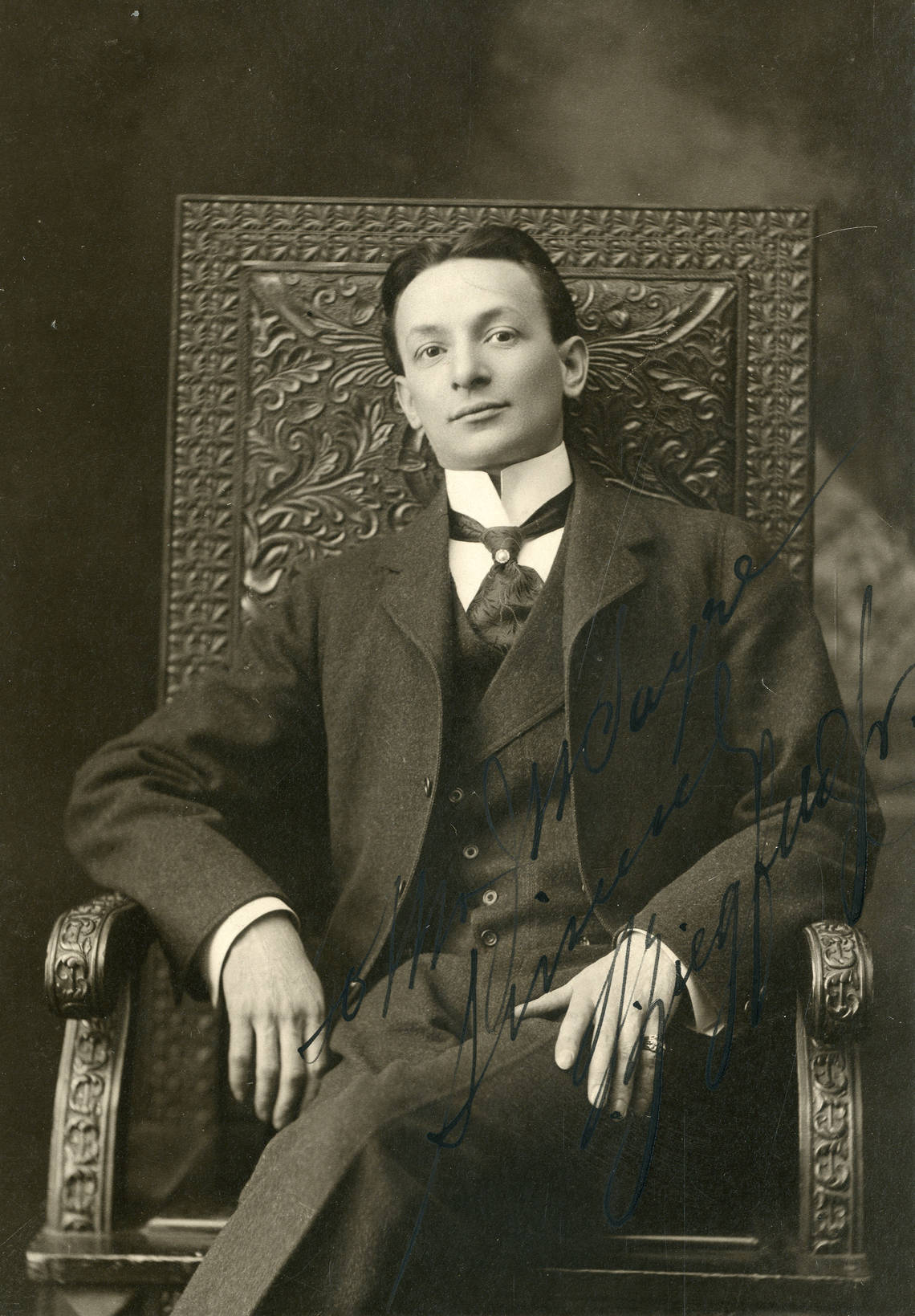
Florenz Ziegfeld, Jr. in 1904

In 1896, Ziegfeld met Anna Held, an actress, in London. Ziegfeld and Held began a common-law marriage in 1897, and she divorced him in 1913, according to her obituary in The New York Times dated August 13, 1918. Held served Ziegfeld with divorce papers on April 14, 1912, and their divorce became final on January 9, 1913. Held had submitted testimony about Ziegfeld's relationship with another woman. The unnamed party in this romantic triangle was showgirl Lillian Lorraine, an entertainer of limited talent but charismatic stage presence and beauty whom Ziegfeld discovered in 1907 when she was a 15-year-old performer in a Shubert production. Ziegfeld spent years promoting her career, transforming her into one of the most popular attractions in his Follies and establishing her in an apartment two floors above the residence he shared with Held. He remained in love with Lorraine for the rest of his life.

Not long after his divorce from Held, Ziegfeld married actress Billie Burke on April 11, 1914. They had met at a New Year's Eve party. They had one child, Patricia Ziegfeld Stephenson (1916–2008). The family lived on his estate in Hastings-on-Hudson, New York, and in Palm Beach, Florida.

Ziegfeld died in Hollywood, California on July 22, 1932, from pleurisy, related to a previous lung infection. He had been in Los Angeles only a few days after moving from a New Mexico sanitarium. His death left Burke with substantial debts, driving her toward film acting to settle them. She died on May 14, 1970. He and Burke are interred in Kensico Cemetery in Valhalla, New York.

== Accolades ==
Ziegfeld was elected to the American Theatre Hall of Fame.

== Broadway theatre productions ==
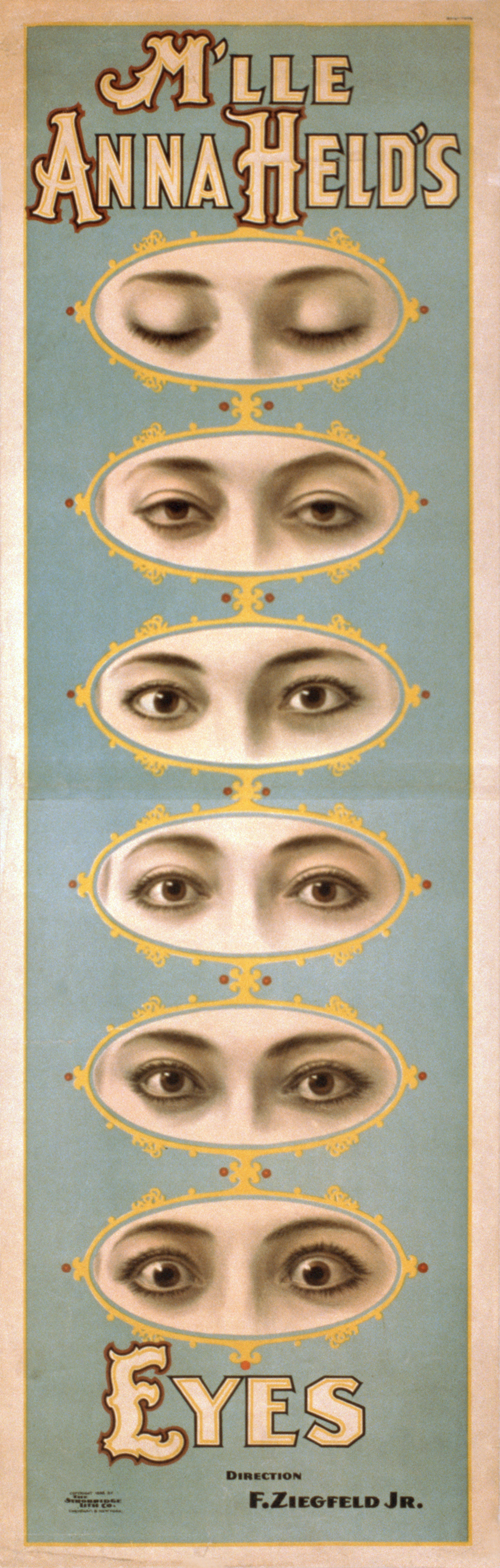
Poster promoting theatre performer Anna Held (c. 1898)

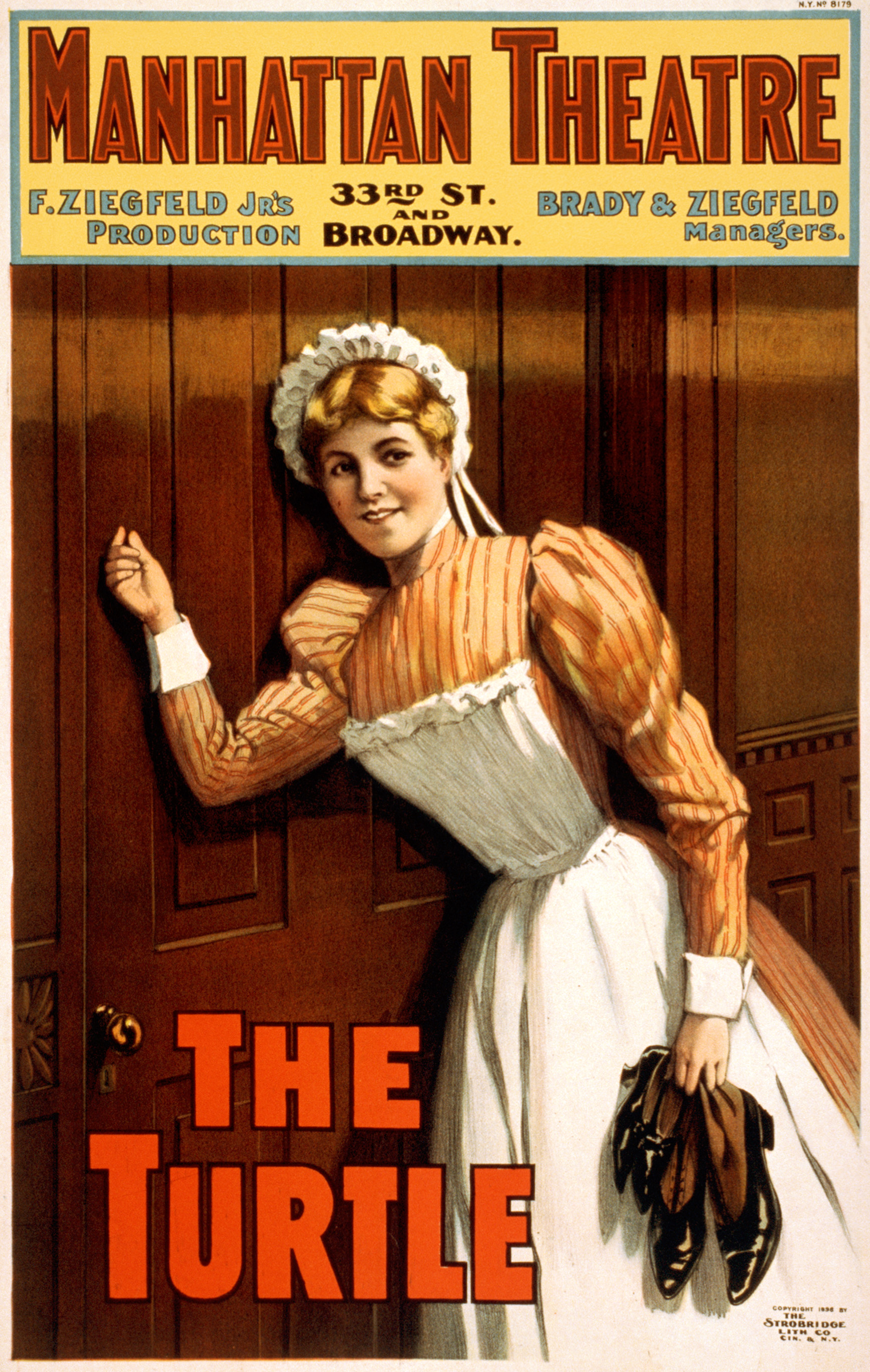
Poster for The Turtle (1898), featuring Sadie Martinot

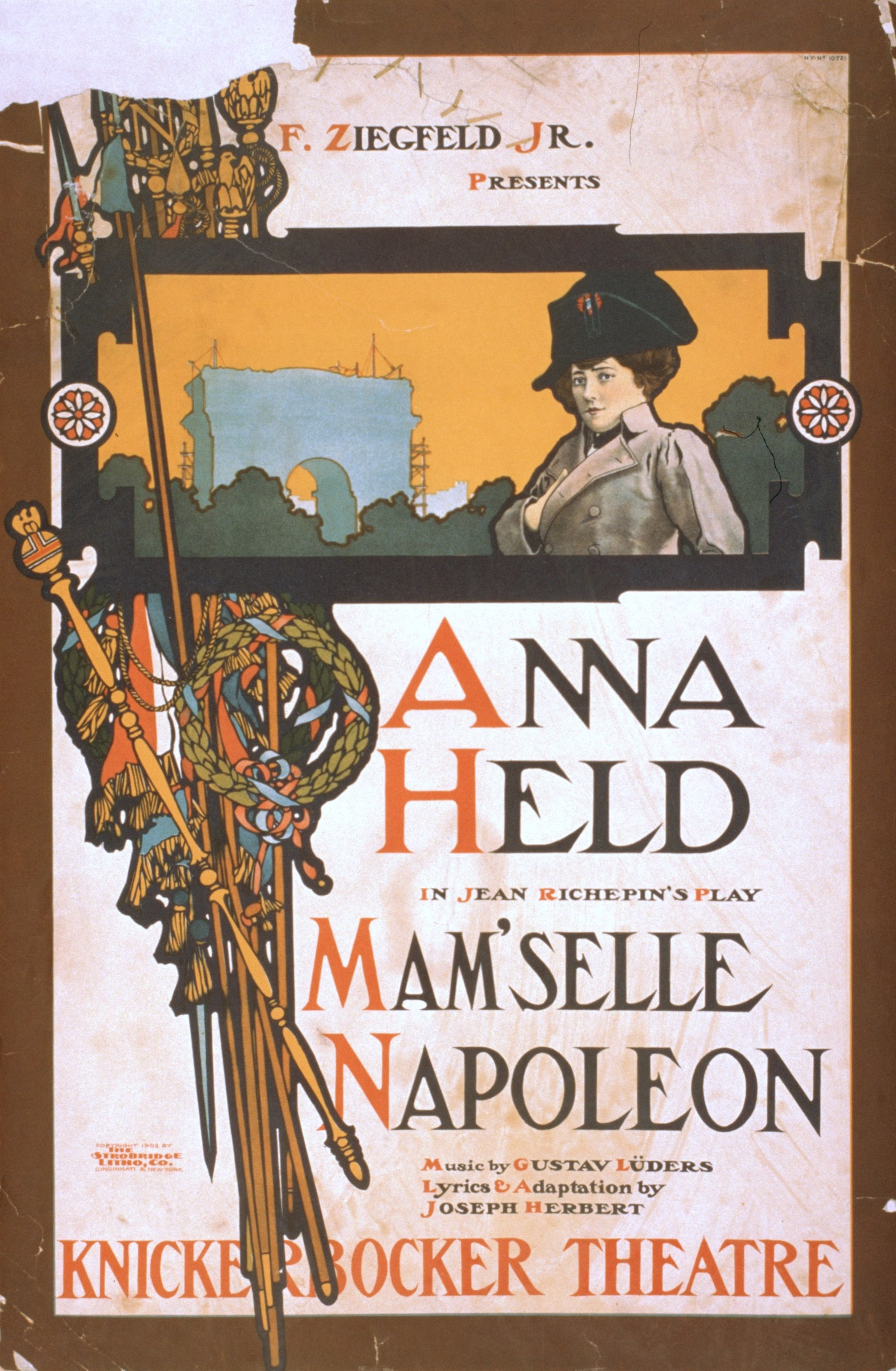
Poster for Mam'selle Napoleon (1903)

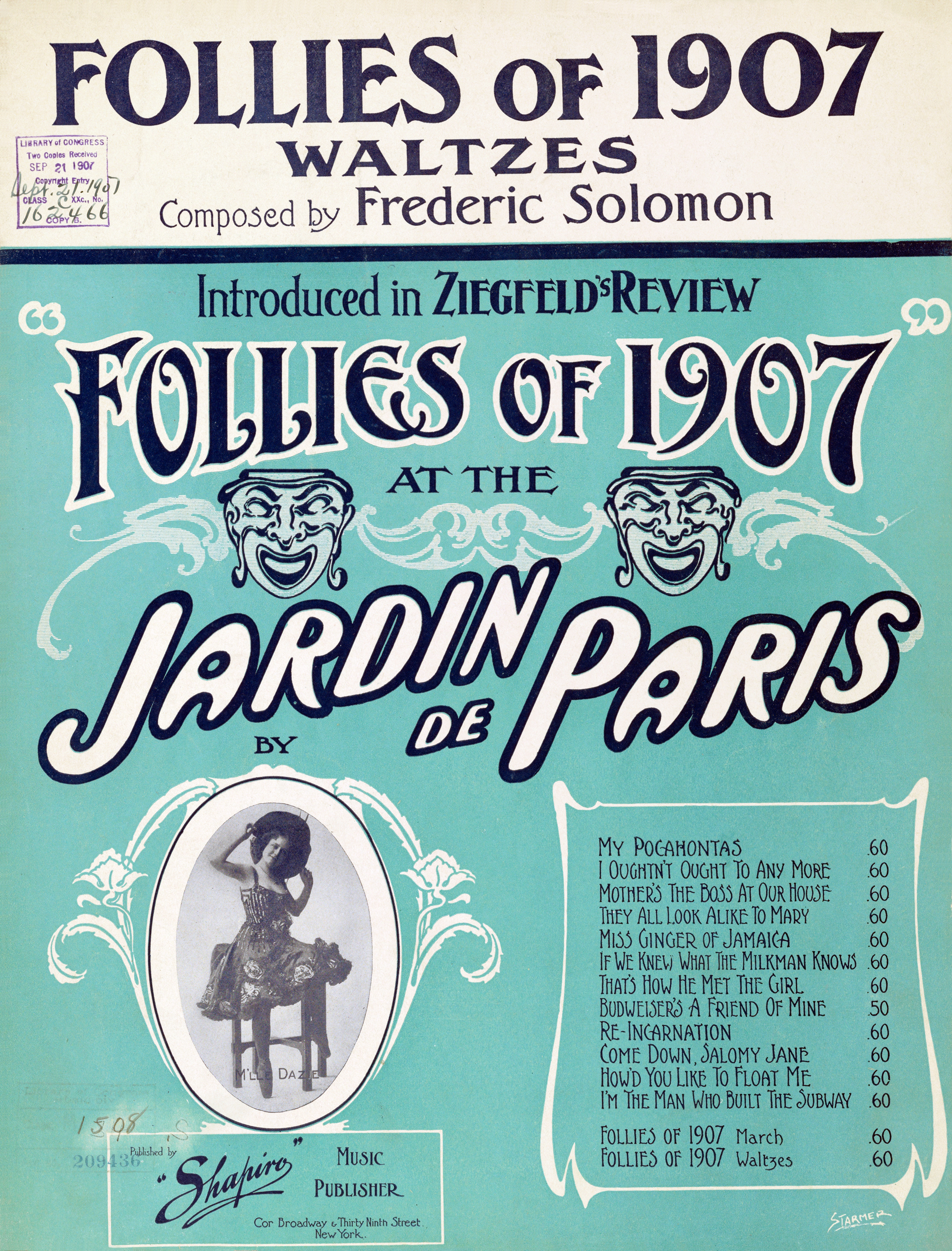
Follies of 1907 sheet music cover

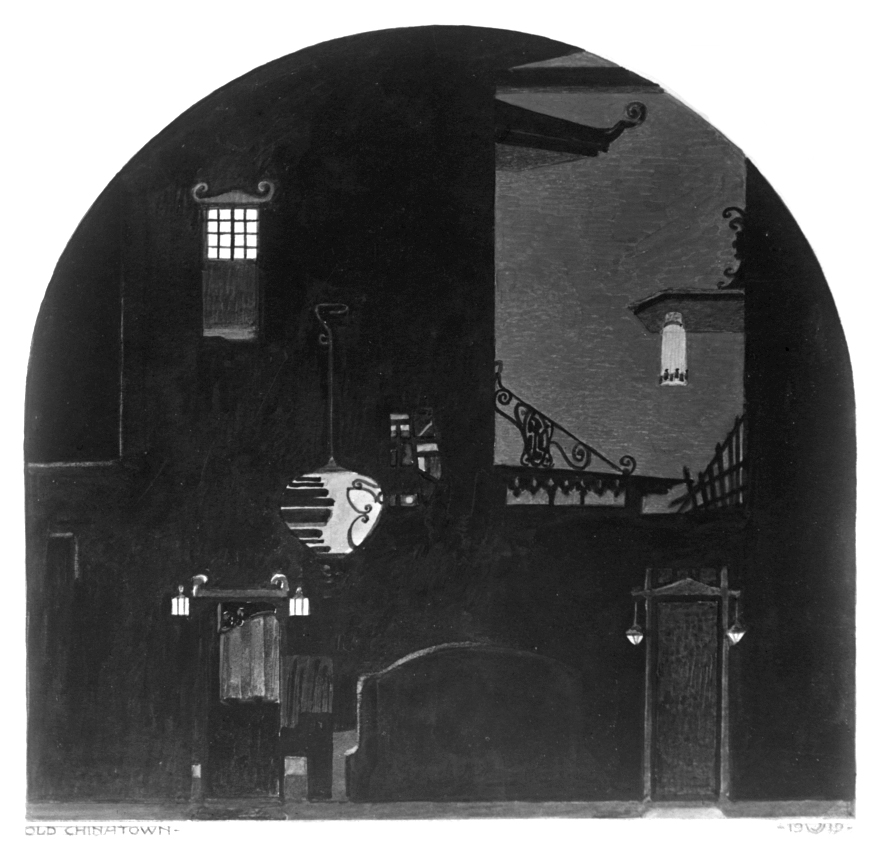
Joseph Urban set design drawing for Ziegfeld Follies of 1919

Broadway theatre productions
Date	Title	Notes
1896	A Parlor Match	Herald Square Theatre
1898	The French Maid	Herald Square Theatre
1898	Way Down East	Manhattan Theatre
1898	The Turtle	Manhattan Theatre
1899	Mlle. Fifi	Manhattan Theatre
1899	The Manicure	Manhattan Theatre
1899–1900	Papa's Wife	Manhattan Theatre
1901–1902	The Little Duchess	Casino Theatre, Grand Opera House
1903–1904	Red Feather	Lyric Theatre, Grand Opera House
1903–1904	Mam'selle Napoleon	Knickerbocker Theatre
1904–1905	Higgledy-Piggledy	Weber and Fields' Broadway Music Hall
1905	Higgledy-Piggledy	Weber and Fields' Broadway Music Hall
1906–1907	The Parisian Model	Broadway Theatre
1907	Follies of 1907	Jardin de Paris, Liberty Theatre, Grand Opera House
1908	The Parisian Model	Broadway Theatre
1908	The Soul Kiss	New York Theatre
1908	Follies of 1908	Jardin de Paris, New York Theatre
1908–1909	Miss Innocence	New York Theatre
1909	Follies of 1909	Jardin de Paris
1909	Miss Innocence	New York Theatre
1910	Follies of 1910	Jardin de Paris
1911	Ziegfeld Follies of 1911	Jardin de Paris
1912	Over the River	Globe Theatre
1912	A Winsome Widow	Moulin Rouge
1912–1913	Ziegfeld Follies of 1912	Moulin Rouge
1913	Ziegfeld Follies of 1913	Moulin Rouge
1914	Ziegfeld Follies of 1914	New Amsterdam Theatre
1915	Ziegfeld Follies of 1915	New Amsterdam Theatre
1916	Ziegfeld Follies of 1916	New Amsterdam Theatre
1916–1917	The Century Girl	Century Theatre
1917	Dance and Grow Thin	Cocoanut Grove Theatre
1917	Ziegfeld Follies of 1917	New Amsterdam Theatre
1917	The Rescuing Angel	Hudson Theatre
1917–1918	Miss 1917	Century Theatre
1917–1918	A Night in Spain	Cocoanut Grove Theatre
1918	Ziegfeld Follies of 1918	New Amsterdam Theatre, Globe Theatre
1918	Ziegfeld Midnight Frolic	Ziegfeld Roof
1918	By Pigeon Post	George M. Cohan's Theatre
1919	Ziegfeld Follies of 1919	New Amsterdam Theatre
1919	Ziegfeld Nine O'Clock Review	New Amsterdam Theatre Roof
1919	Ziegfeld Midnight Frolic	Danse de Follies
1919	Caesar's Wife	Liberty Theatre
1919–1920	Elsie Janis and Her Gang	George M. Cohan's Theatre
1920	Ziegfeld Girls of 1920	Danse de Follies
1920	Ziegfeld Follies of 1920	New Amsterdam Theatre
1920–1922	Sally	New Amsterdam Theatre
1921	Ziegfeld Midnight Frolic	Ziegfeld Roof
1921	Ziegfeld 9 O'Clock Frolic	Danse de Follies
1921	Ziegfeld Follies of 1921	Globe Theatre
1921–1922	The Intimate Strangers	Henry Miller's Theatre
1921–1922	Ziegfeld Midnight Frolic	Danse de Follies
1922	Ziegfeld Follies of 1922	New Amsterdam Theatre
1922–1923	Rose Briar	Empire Theatre
1923	Ziegfeld Follies of 1923	New Amsterdam Theatre
1923	Sally	New Amsterdam Theatre
1923–1924	Ziegfeld Follies of 1923	New Amsterdam Theatre
1923–1925	Kid Boots	Earl Carroll Theatre, Selwyn Theatre
1924–1925	Ziegfeld Follies of 1924	New Amsterdam Theatre
1924–1925	Annie Dear	Times Square Theatre
1925	Louis the 14th	Cosmopolitan Theatre
1925	Ziegfeld Follies of 1925	New Amsterdam Theatre
1926	No Foolin'	Globe Theatre
1926–1927	Betsy	New Amsterdam Theatre
1927–1928	Rio Rita	Ziegfeld Theatre, Lyric Theatre, Majestic Theatre
1927–1928	Ziegfeld Follies of 1927	New Amsterdam Theatre
1927–1929	Show Boat	Ziegfeld Theatre
1928	Rosalie	Ziegfeld Theatre
1928	The Three Musketeers	Lyric Theatre
1928–1929	Whoopee!	New Amsterdam Theatre
1929	Ziegfeld Midnight Frolic	Frolic Theatre
1929	Show Girl	Ziegfeld Theatre
1929–1930	Bitter Sweet	Ziegfeld Theatre, Shubert Theatre
1930	Simple Simon	Ziegfeld Theatre
1930–1931	Smiles	Ziegfeld Theatre
1931	Ziegfeld Follies of 1931	Ziegfeld Theatre
1932	Hot-Cha!	Ziegfeld Theatre
1932	Show Boat	Casino Theatre

== Films ==
Ziegfeld appears in a sound prologue to the 1929 film, Show Boat—a part-talkie based on Edna Ferber's 1926 novel, not the popular stage adaptation that was still playing on Broadway when the film was released. Universal Pictures originally made Show Boat as a silent, and obtained the rights to the popular Broadway score after the film was shot. The 18-minute prologue is introduced by Ziegfeld and producer Carl Laemmle, and features excerpts from the stage production performed by cast members Jules Bledsoe, Tess Gardella, Helen Morgan and the Broadway chorus. Two subsequent adaptations of Show Boat, in 1936 and 1951, were based on the stage musical.

Technicolor screen versions of three of Ziegfeld's stage musicals were produced in the early sound film era. RKO Pictures had its first hit with its lavish presentation of Rio Rita (1929), starring Bebe Daniels and John Boles.

Marilyn Miller reprised one of her greatest stage successes in Sally (1929). Eddie Cantor reprised his popular Broadway role in Whoopee! (1930), which Ziegfeld himself produced with Samuel Goldwyn.

== Cultural references ==
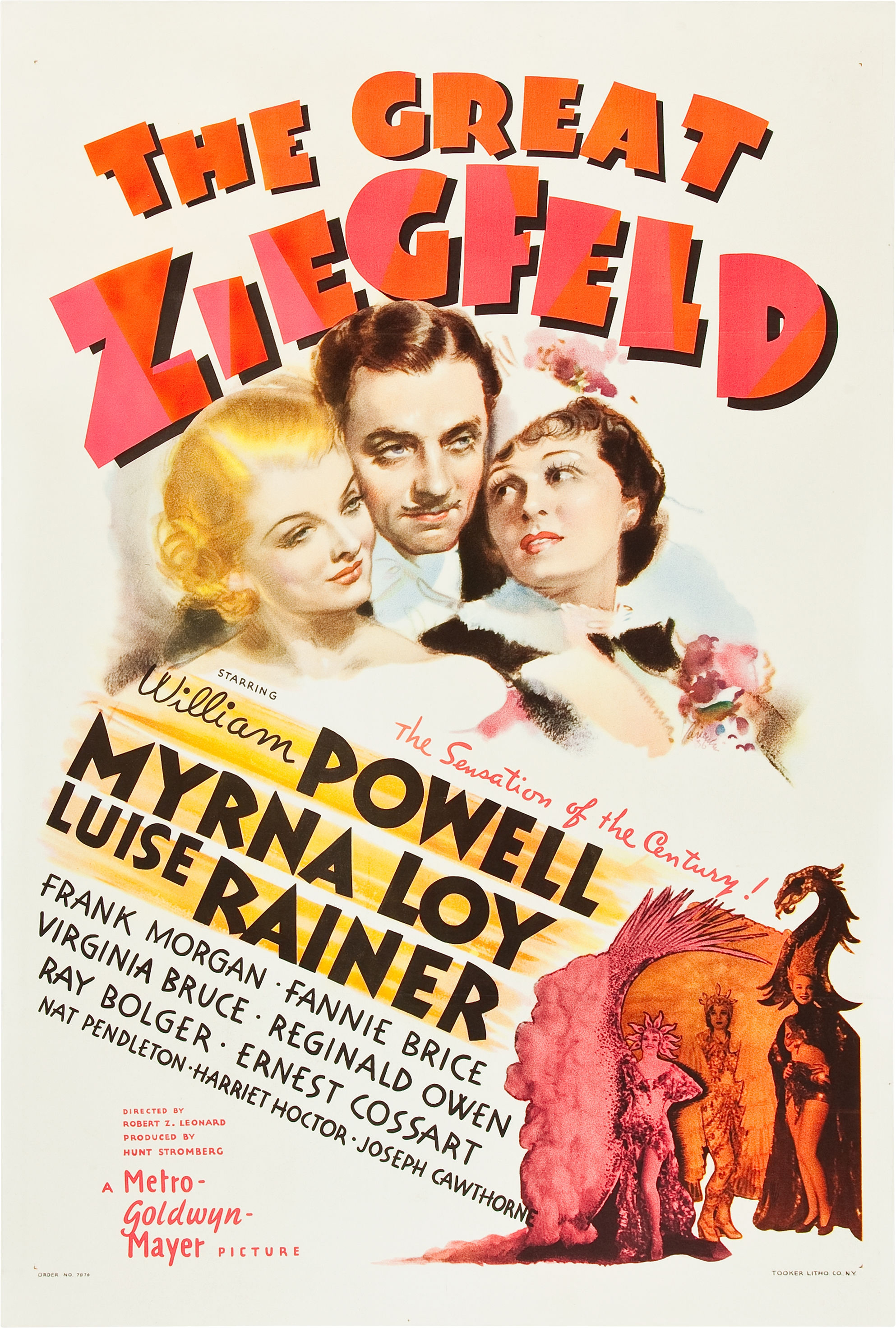
Poster for The Great Ziegfeld (1936)

In 1936 Metro-Goldwyn-Mayer released a semi-biographical film extravaganza, The Great Ziegfeld, starring William Powell. He was personally chosen for the role by Billie Burke, who felt that while Powell did not physically resemble her late husband, he possessed the right manner. "What I tried to do primarily was to get across the essential spirit of the man", Powell later said, "his love for show business, his exquisite taste, his admiration for the beauty of women. He was financially impractical but aesthetically impeccable—a genius in his chosen field." Nominated for seven Academy Awards, The Great Ziegfeld received Oscars for Best Picture, Best Actress (Luise Rainer as Anna Held), and Best Dance Direction (Seymour Felix), for the astonishingly opulent production number, "A Pretty Girl Is Like a Melody"—one of the most famous musical sequences ever filmed. It was MGM's most expensive production since Ben-Hur (1925), and it made back twice its cost.

Released by MGM ten years later, Ziegfeld Follies (1946) was an all-star revue that includes Powell in a cameo role as Ziegfeld. A 1978 NBC-television film, Ziegfeld: The Man and His Women, stars Paul Shenar as Ziegfeld. Directed by Buzz Kulik, the three-hour biopic was nominated for seven Emmy Awards and received the award for Outstanding Cinematography (Gerald Finnerman).

Ziegfeld appears as a character in a number of films:

- The Jolson Story (1946), played by Eddie Kane
- I'll See You in My Dreams (1951), played by William Forrest
- The Story of Will Rogers (1952), played by William Forrest
- The I Don't Care Girl (1953), played by Wilton Graff
- The Eddie Cantor Story (1953), played by William Forrest
- Deep in my Heart (1954) played by Paul Henried
- The Helen Morgan Story (1957), played by Walter Woolf King
- Funny Girl (1968), played by Walter Pidgeon; played by Roger DeKoven in the original Broadway stage production
- W. C. Fields and Me (1976), played by Paul Stewart
- Ellis Island (1984) played by Julian Holloway

The Stephen Sondheim-James Goldman musical "Follies" (1971) was inspired by a reunion of Ziegfeld Girls. The show features the character of Dimitri Weismann as a fictionalized version of Ziegfeld, and is set at a reunion of women who had been in the cast of the "Weismann Follies". In the Broadway musical Crazy For You (1992), the character Bela Zangler is a fictionalised version of Ziegfeld, having his own "Zangler's Follies" and his character being driven by a love for the young folly Tess despite being married, much like Ziegfeld's own affair with Lillian Lorraine. In The Drowsy Chaperone, a similar fictionalised parody of Ziegfeld is Victor Feldzieg, producer of Feldzieg's Follies.

== Archive ==
The Academy Film Archive houses the Florenz Ziegfeld-Billie Burke Collection. The collection consists primarily of home movies.
