= 1901 in music =

This is a list of notable events in music that took place in the year 1901.

== Specific locations ==
- 1901 in Norwegian music

== Events ==
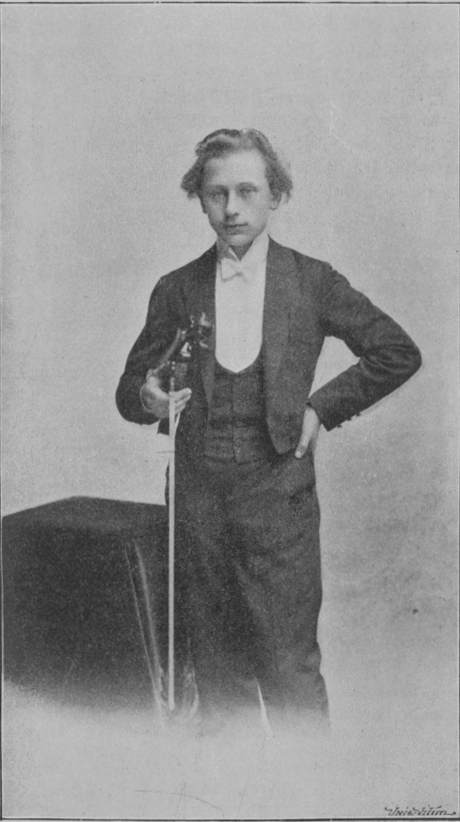
Jaroslav Kocián in 1901

- January 13 – The New York Herald reviewing the work of Abe Holzmann, comments that "[h]is knowledge of bass and counterpoint is thorough, and his standard compositions bear the stamp of harmonic lore, which makes his proclivity for the writing of the popular style of music the more remarkable."
- February 4 – Puccini's Tosca makes its U.S. debut at the Metropolitan Opera in New York.
- February 17 – Das klagende Lied, by Gustav Mahler, receives its world premiere by the Vienna Philharmonic in that city, Mahler conducting.
- March 29
  - Alexander Scriabin's Symphony No.1 in E Minor, Op. 26, is performed in its complete version in Moscow.
  - Verdi's funeral procession in Milan attracts a crowd of 300,000.
  - Tenor Jean de Reszke's final performance of the season with the Metropolitan Opera in New York turns into his farewell performance with that company as he sings the title role in Richard Wagner's Lohengrin.
- April 18 – Contralto Mariska Horvath marries politician J. Frank Aldrich.
- April 29 – Jean de Reszke returns to the stage to sing the second act of Wagner's Tristan und Isolde at the Metropolitan Opera in New York.
- May 3 – Marcel Dupré's oratorio Le songe de Jacob (Jacob's dream) premieres in France with Dupré playing the organ part himself.
- May 17 - Benedictine monks of the Solesmes Congregation are publicly lauded by Pope Leo XIII for their scholarly work on Gregorian chant.
- June 1 – The classical music publishing firm Universal Edition is founded in Vienna.
- June 20 – Edward Elgar's overture Cockaigne (In London Town) receives its world premiere as Elgar conducts the London Philharmonic Orchestra.
- June 23 – Ernest Bloch's symphonic Vivre Aimer premieres at the Second Festival of Swiss Music in Geneva.
- June 30 – Maurice Ravel scores third place in the annual Prix de Rome competition with the cantata Myrrha.
- September 20 – The German music periodical Die Musik, an illustrated journal, is published for the first time in Berlin.
- October 3 – Eldridge Johnson establishes the Victor Talking Machine Company and is permitted to use the dog trademark "His Master's Voice".
- October 15 – Geraldine Farrar makes her operatic debut with the Berlin Royal Opera as Margueritte in Gounod's Faust.
- October 19 – Edward Elgar's first two Pomp and Circumstance Marches premiere in Liverpool.
- October 27 – Claude Debussy's Trois Nocturnes are given their first complete performance as Camille Chevillard conducts the Lamoureux Orchestra in Paris.
- October – The Columbia Phonograph Company issues the first recordings under its Climax label.
- October - The National Gramophone Company issues the first celebrity red-label disc featuring artists from the Russian Imperial Opera.
- October - The International Zonophone Company is established.
- November 9 – First complete performance of Sergei Rachmaninoff's Piano Concerto No. 2 in C Minor in Moscow with the composer playing the solo part.
- November 25 – Premiere of Gustav Mahler's Symphony No. 4 in G Major under the composer's baton in Munich.
- December 9 – Violinist Jaroslav Kocián makes his debut at St James's Hall in London.
- December 20 – Henry Hadley's Symphony No. 2 (The Four Seasons) is performed by Emil Paur and the New York Symphony Orchestra.
- Enrique Granados founds the Academia Granados in Spain.
- Percy Grainger makes his recital debut.
- Thirteen-year-old Agustín Barrios begins attending university in Asunción on a music scholarship.
- Ragtime popularity grows.

== Published popular music ==
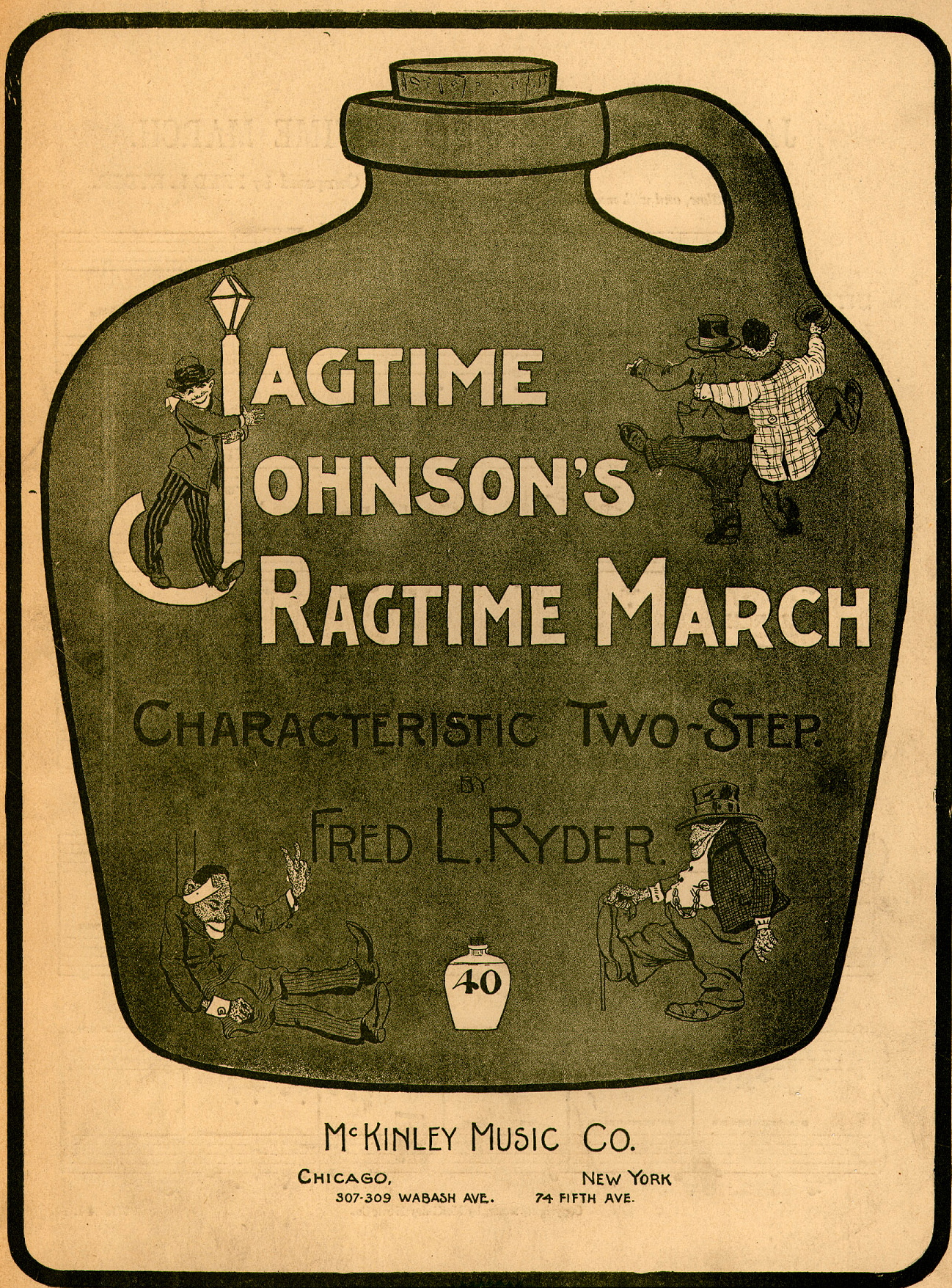

- "All That Glitters Is Not Gold" w. George A. Norton m. James W. Casey
- "Any Old Place I Can Hang My Hat Is Home Sweet Home To Me" w. William Jerome m. Jean Schwartz
- "At The Pan-I-Marry-Can" w. Harry Dillon m. John Dillon
- "Baby Mine" w. Raymond A. Browne m. Leo Friedman
- "Blaze Away!" m. Abe Holzmann
- "Coon, Coon, Coon" by Leo Friedman & Gene Jefferson
- "The Country Girl" w. Stanislaus Stange m. Julian Edwards
- "Don't Put Me Off At Buffalo Any More" w. William Jerome m. Jean Schwartz
- "Down Where The Cotton Blossoms Grow" w. Andrew B. Sterling m. Harry Von Tilzer
- "Eyes Of Blue, Eyes Of Brown" w.m. Costen & Andrew B. Sterling
- "The Easy Winners" w. Scott Joplin
- "Flora, I Am Your Adorer" w. Vincent P. Bryan m. Charles Robinson
- "The Fortune Telling Man" w.m. Bert Williams & George Walker
- "Go Way Back And Sit Down" w. Elmer Bowman m. Al Johns
- "He Ought To Have A Tablet In The Hall of Fame" w. Arthur L. Robb m. John Walter Bratton
- "Hello Central, Give Me Heaven" w.m. Charles K. Harris
- "Hiawatha" w. James O'Dea m. Neil Moret Words written 1903.
- "High Society" (march) by Porter Steele
- "Hoity-Toity" w. Edgar Smith m. John Stromberg
- "I Ain't A-goin' To Weep No More" w. George Totten Smith m. Harry von Tilzer
- "I Hate To Get Up Early In The Morning" w. John Queen m. Hughie Cannon
- "I Love You Truly" w.m. Carrie Jacobs-Bond
- "I Want To Be A Lidy" w. George Dance m. George Dee
- "If You Love Your Baby, Make Dem Goo-Goo Eyes" w. Bert Williams m. George Walker
- "I'll Be With You When The Roses Bloom Again" w. Will D. Cobb m. Gus Edwards
- "I'm Tired" w. William Jerome m. Jean Schwartz
- "In The Shade Of The Palm" w.m. Leslie Stuart
- "The Invincible Eagle March" w.m. John Philip Sousa
- "It Seems Like Yesterday" w. Frederic Ranken m. Isidore Witmark
- "I've Grown So Used To You" w.m. Thurland Chattaway
- "Josephine, My Jo" w. Cecil Mack m. J. Tim Brymn
- "Just Awearyin' for You" w. Frank Lebby Stanton m. Carrie Jacobs-Bond
- "The Maiden With The Dreamy Eyes" w. James Weldon Johnson & Bob Cole m. J. Rosamond Johnson
- "Mamie, Don't You Feel Ashamie" w. Will D. Cobb m. Gus Edwards
- "Mighty Lak' A Rose" w. Frank Lebby Stanton m. Ethelbert Nevin
- "My Castle On The Nile" w. Bob Cole & James Weldon Johnson m. J. Rosamond Johnson
- "My Japanese Cherry Blossom" w. Edgar Smith m. John Stromberg
- "My Lady Hottentot" w. William Jerome m. Harry von Tilzer
- "My Lonesome Little Louisiana Lady" w. Will D. Cobb m. Gus Edwards
- "My Own United States" w. Stanislaus Stange m. Julian Edwards
- "Oh! Oh! Miss Phoebe" w. Andrew B. Sterling m. Harry von Tilzer
- "Panamericana" m. Victor Herbert
- "The Phrenologist Coon" w. Ernest Hogan m. Will Accooee
- "A Picture Without A Frame" w.m. Al Wilbur & Harry Jonnes
- "Rusty Rags" Vess Ossman
- "Sally's Sunday Hat" w. Will D. Cobb m. Gus Edwards
- "Serenade" w. Jerry Gray & Herb Hendler m. Riccardo Drigo
- Seven Songs as Unpretentious as the Wild Rose Carrie Jacobs-Bond
- "She's Getting More Like The White Folks Every Day" w.m. Bert Williams & George Walker
- "A Signal from Mars" by E. T. Paull
- "Sunflower Slow Drag" m. Scott Joplin & Scott Hayden
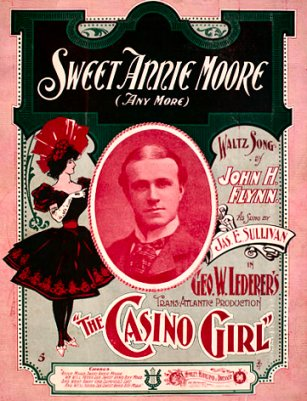
- "Tact" w.m. Leslie Stuart
- "Tell Me Dusky Maiden" w. James Weldon Johnson & Bob Cole m. J. Rosamond Johnson
- "Tell Us Pretty Ladies" w. Edgar Smith m. John Stromberg
- "There's No North Or South Today" w.m. Paul Dresser
- "Tobermory" w.m. Harry Lauder
- "Way Down In Indiana" w.m. Paul Dresser
- "Way Down Yonder In The Cornfield" w. Will D. Cobb m. Gus Edwards
- "We Shall Overcome" w. C. Albert Tindley Music 1794 "O Sanctissima".
- "The Wedding Of Reuben And The Maid" (or "They were on their honeymoon") w. Harry B. Smith m. Maurice Levi
- "When It's All Goin' Out And Nothin' Comin' In" w.m. Bert Williams & George Walker words revised by James W Johnson.
- "When Mr Shakespeare Comes To Town" (or "I don't like them minstrel folks")w. William Jerome m. Jean Schwartz
- "When Two Little Hearts Are One" w. Edgar Smith m. John Stromberg

== Recorded popular music ==
- "A German Minstrel"
  – George P. Watson on Edison Records
- "Good Evening Carrie"
  – Dan W. Quinn
- "In the Shade of the Old Apple Tree"
  – William Baird
- "Just As the Sun Went Down"
  – J.J. Fisher on Consolidated Phonograph
- "Ma Tiger Lily"
  – Arthur Collins on a Victor Monarch Record

== Classical music ==
- Hakon Børresen – String Sextet opus 5 in G major
- Frank Bridge
  - Scherzo Phantastick
  - String Quintet in E minor (probably)
  - Berceuse for viola or cello and piano
- André Caplet – Myrrha (cantata)
- Claude Debussy
  - Chansons de Bilitis receives its first performance in Paris
  - Pour le piano
- Ernő Dohnányi – Symphony No. 1 in D minor, Op. 9
- Felix Draeseke – String Quintet opus 77 in F major for two violins, viola and two cellos
- Edward Elgar – Pomp and Circumstance Marches, no. 1 and 2
- George Enescu –
  - Romanian Rhapsody No. 1 in A major, op. 11, no. 1
  - Romanian Rhapsody No. 2 in D major, op. 11, no. 2
  - Symphonie concertante for cello and orchestra in B minor, op. 8
- Gabriel Faure's - orchestral suite Pelleas et Melisande premieres at the Concerts Lamoureux in Paris
- Louis Glass - Symphony No.3, Op. 30 "The Forest Symphony"
- Alexander Glazunov – Piano Sonatas 1 and 2 opus 74 and 75 in B-flat minor and E minor
- Edvard Grieg – Lyric Pieces, Book X
- Sergei Rachmaninoff – Piano Concerto No. 2 in C minor, Op. 18
- Maurice Ravel – Jeux d'eau
- Ottorino Respighi – String Quintet for two violins, two violas and cello
- Sergei Taneyev – String Quintet opus 14 in G major for two violins, viola and two cellos
- Ludwig Thuille – Piano Quintet opus 20 in E-flat major

== Opera ==
- George W. Chadwick – Judith, premieres in a concert version at the Worcester, Massachusetts Music Festival, September 26
- Cesar Cui – A Feast in Time of Plague, one-act opera is performed for the first time in Moscow, November 24
- Antonín Dvořák – Rusalka, premieres at the National Opera House in Prague, March 31
- Enrique Granados – Picarol, premieres at Teatre Líric Català de Barcelona, February 23
- Pietro Mascagni – Le maschere, premieres simultaneously in six different Italien cities, January 17
- Jules Massenet – Grisélidis, premieres at the Opera-Comique in Paris, November 20
- Giacomo Orefice – Chopin, premieres at Teatro Lirico, Milan, November 25
- Ignace Jan Paderewski – Manru, premieres at the Dresden Opera, May 29
- Hans Pfitzner – Die Rose vom Liebesgarten, premieres in Elberfeld, Germany, November 9
- Camille Saint-Saens – Les Barbares, produced at the Paris Opera, October 23
- Charles Villiers Stanford – Much Ado About Nothing, premieres at Covent Garden, London, May 30
- Richard Strauss – Feuersnot, premieres at the Konigliches Opernhouse in Dresden, November 21

== Ballet ==
- Soldiers of the Queen – ballet spectacle is produced at the Alhambra Theater in London, January 1
- Leopold Wenzel - La Papillons - produced at the Empire Theater, London, March 18
- Leo Delibes - Silvia is staged for the Mariinsky Theatre in Saint Petersburg as a benefit for the ballerina Olga Preobrajenska, December 15

== Musical theater ==
- Blue Bell In Fairyland London production
- A Chinese Honeymoon London production opened at the Strand Theatre on October 5 and ran for 1075 performances.
- The Emerald Isle London production opened at the Savoy Theatre on April 27 and ran for 205 performances.
- The Fortune Teller London production opened at the Shaftesbury Theatre on April 7.
- Hoity-Toity Broadway revue opened at the Weber and Fields' Broadway Music Hall on September 5 and ran for 225 performances.
- Kitty Grey London production opened at the Apollo Theatre on September 7 and ran for 220 performances.
- The Little Duchess Broadway production opened at the Casino Theatre on October 14 and ran for 136 performances. Book and lyrics by Harry B. Smith, music by Reginald De Koven.
- The Rogers Brothers In Washington Broadway production opened at the Knickerbocker Theatre on September 2 and ran for 49 performances
- The Silver Slipper London production opened at the Lyric Theatre on June 1 and ran for 197 performances
- The Supper Club Broadway production opened on December 23 at the Winter Garden Theatre and ran for 40 performances.
- The Toreador London production opened at the Gaiety Theatre on June 17

== Births ==
- January 22 – Hans Erich Apostel, composer (d. 1972)
- February 2 – Jascha Heifetz, violinist (d. 1987)
- February 9 – Sebastian Kunjukunju Bhagavathar, Malayalam actor, singer and author (d. 1985)
- February 15 – Kokomo Arnold, blues musician (d. 1968)
- March 21 – Nikos Skalkottas, Greek composer (d. 1949)
- March 27 – Enrique Santos Discépolo, Argentinian tango musician, composer and writer (d. 1951)
- April 9 – Arthur Briggs, jazz trumpeter (d. 1991)
- May 7 – Marcel Poot, Belgian composer (d. 1988)
- May 12 – Scrappy Lambert, US singer (d. 1987)
- May 17 – Werner Egk, composer (d. 1983)
- May 21 – Horace Heidt, US bandleader (d. 1986)
- May 23 – Edmund Rubbra, composer (d. 1986)
- May 30 – Frankie Trumbauer, US saxophonist, bandleader and singer (d. 1956)
- June 6 – Véra Korène, actress and singer (d. 1996)
- June 10 – Frederick Loewe, American composer of musicals (d. 1988)
- June 13 – Anna Báthy, Hungarian soprano (d. 1962)
- June 24 – Harry Partch, composer (d. 1974)
- June 29 – Nelson Eddy, US singer and actor (d. 1967)
- July 3 – Ruth Crawford Seeger, composer (d. 1953)
- July 14 – Gerald Finzi, English composer (d. 1956)
- July 16 – Fritz Mahler, Austrian conductor, a nephew of Gustav Mahler (d. 1973)
- July 28 – Rudy Vallée, singer & bandleader (d. 1986)
- August 4 – Louis Armstrong, jazz trumpeter, composer, bandleader, singer (d. 1971)
- August 11 – Guido Agosti, Italian pianist and piano teacher (d. 1989)
- August 16 – Olav Kielland, Norwegian composer and conductor (d. 1985)
- August 17 – Henri Tomasi, French composer (d. 1971)
- September 2 – Phil Napoleon, jazz trumpeter (d. 1990)
- September 9 – James Blades, percussionist (d. 1999)
- September 12 – Ernst Pepping, composer (d. 1981)
- September 26 – Ted Weems, US bandleader (d. 1963)
- October 2
  - Walther Aeschbacher, Swiss conductor and composer (d. 1969)
  - Alice Prin ("Kiki de Montparnasse"), entertainer (d. 1953)
- October 7 – Ralph Rainger, US composer and pianist (d. 1942)
- October 8 – Eivind Groven, composer (d. 1977)
- October 18 – Annette Hanshaw, US singer (d. 1985)
- October 20
  - Frank Churchill, US composer (d. 1942)
  - Adelaide Hall, US singer, actress and entertainer (d.1993)
- October 25 – Roy Fox, American-born British bandleader (d. 1982)
- November 1 – Hans Heinz Stuckenschmidt German composer (d. 1988)
- November 5 – Etta Moten Barnett, US contralto singer and actress (d. 2004)
- November 21 – Giacomo Vaghi, Italian opera singer (d. 1978)
- November 22 – Joaquin Rodrigo, Spanish composer (d. 1999)
- December 10 – Noël Eadie, Scottish soprano (d. 1950)
- December 22 – André Kostelanetz, conductor and arranger (d. 1980)
- December 26 – Victor Hely-Hutchinson, composer (d. 1947)
- December 27 – Marlene Dietrich, German-American actress (d. 1992)

== Deaths ==
- January 11 – Vasily Kalinnikov, composer (b. 1866)
- January 27 – Giuseppe Verdi, composer (b. 1813)
- February 11 – Henry Willis, organ builder (b. 1821)
- February 17 – Ethelbert Woodbridge Nevin, pianist and composer (b. 1862)
- February 28 – Julius Prott (also known as Guilio Perotti), German operatic tenor (b. 1841)
- March 19 – Philippe Gille, librettist (b. 1831)
- March 31 – Sir John Stainer, composer and organist (b. 1840)
- April 3 – Richard D'Oyly Carte, producer of Gilbert & Sullivan (b. 1844)
- April 14 – Alice Barnett, singer and actress (b. 1846)
- May 2 – Franz Rummel, pianist (b. 1853)
- May 9 – Gottfried von Preyer, conductor, composer and music teacher (b. 1807)
- May 20 – Betty Fibichová operatic contralto (b. 1846)
- June 14 – Ralph E. Hudson, American hymnwriter (b. 1843)
- June 17 – Cornelius Gurlitt, composer (b. 1820)
- June 23 – Charles Kensington Salaman, composer (b. 1814)
- July 18 – Carlo Alfredo Piatti, cellist (b. 1822)
- August 17 – Edmond Audran, composer (b. 1842)
- August 24 – Gunnar Wennerberg, poet, politician and composer (b. 1817)
- September 3 – Friedrich Chrysander, music historian and critic (b. 1826)
- September 29 – Adelaide Borghi-Mamo, mezzo-soprano (b. 1826)
- October 22 – Frederic Archer, organist, conductor and composer (b. 1838)
- November 25 – Josef Rheinberger, Liechtensteinian organist and composer (b. 1839)
- December 15 – Elias Álvares Lobo, composer (b. 1834)
