= Whoop Dee Doo =

Whoop Dee Doo may refer to:

- Whoop Dee Doo, a polka
- Whoop Dee Doo, a variety show
- Whoop-Dee-Doo!, a musical revue, 1993-1994
- Whoop-Dee-Doo, a 1904 Broadway musical
- Whoop De Doo, song from the 2004 album Shangri-La by Mark Knopfler
- Whoop Dee Doo, an album by The Muffs
