= Hip! Hip! Hooray! (1907 musical) =

1907 Broadway musical

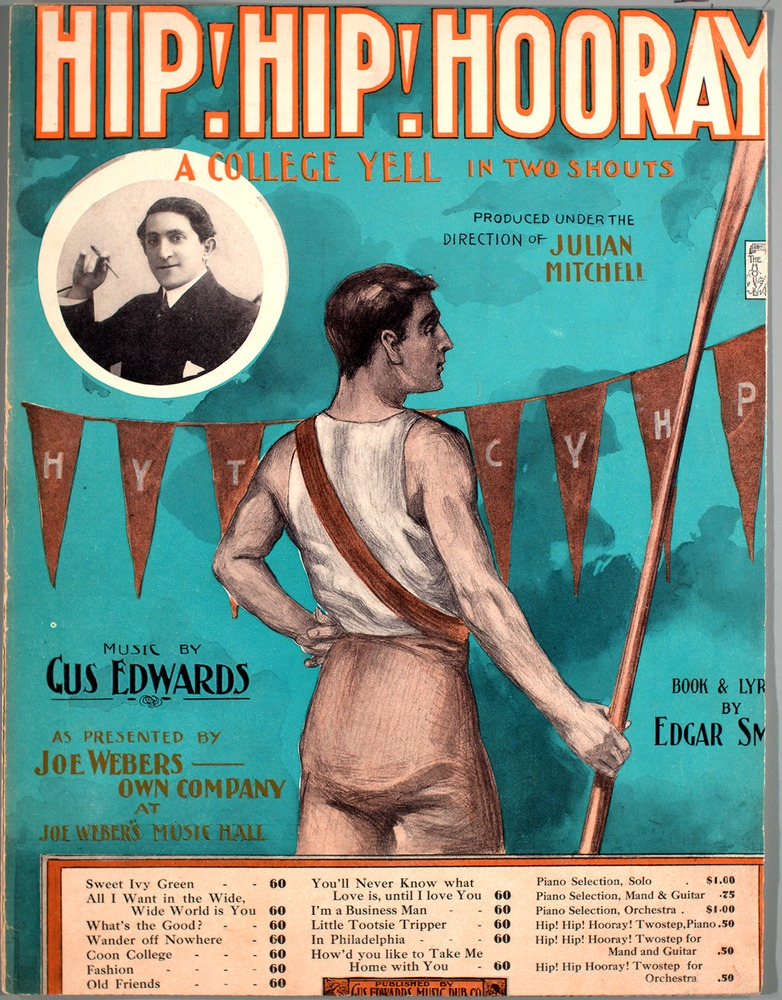
Cover of the sheet music for the song "A College Yell" from the 1907 musical Hip! Hip! Hooray!

Hip! Hip! Hooray! is a musical in two acts with music by Gus Edwards and both lyrics and book by Edgar Smith. It was written as a starring vehicle for the comedian Joe Weber, premiering on Broadway at Weber's Music Hall on October 10, 1907. It ran at that theatre for 64 performances, closing on December 7, 1907.

The story takes place at the fictional Doolittle College, where two German professors attempt to popularize a new breakfast cereal, "Excited Oats", while simultaneously becoming entangled in romance, one with a widow and the other with a beautiful young woman.

== Cast ==
- Joe Weber as German professor
- Dick Bernard as German professor
- Valeska Suratt as widow
- Bessie Clayton as village belle

== Musical numbers ==
- Sweet Ivy Green
- All I Want in the Wide, Wide World is You
- What's the Good?
- Wander off Nowhere
- Coon College
- Fashion
- Old Friends
- You'll Never Know what Love is, until I love You
- I'm a Business Man
- Little Tootsie Tripper
- In Philadelphia
- How'd you like to Take Me Home with You
- Hip! Hip Hooray!
