= The Magic Knight =

The Magic Knight is a one-act Victorian burlesque with music by Victor Herbert and a libretto by Edgar Smith. The piece parodies Wagner's opera Lohengrin.

The original production opened at Weber's Music Hall in New York City on December 25, 1906, and ran for 102 performances until March 23, 1907. It was played as a show within a show with Herbert and Smith's two-act operetta, Dream City.

Modern performances of the piece, especially with orchestra, are rare. It was performed without orchestra, within Dream City, during the 2006 Victor Herbert Festival in Ann Arbor, Michigan. It was performed in Ohio Light Opera's 2014 Festival, and the company released a full recording of Dream City and The Magic Knight through Albany Records. There is also a live production recording available through the Operetta Foundation.

== Synopsis ==
Elsa is accused of murdering her brother, Godfrey, who has mysteriously disappeared, but Elsa is guilty of nothing more than an excessive fondness for singing cadenzas. Frederick, who was to have married Elsa, marries the enchantress Ortrud, instead. Ortrud has turned Godfrey into a swan. Elsa calls upon a magic knight to save her by engaging in combat with Frederick. A first call to fairyland to summon the knight is unsuccessful, but after a second call, the knight arrives on the back of the enchanted swan. The knight soon defeats the cowardly Frederick and turns the swan back into Godfrey. He asks Elsa to marry him, but when she asks his name, the enchantment is broken. He must return to fairyland, leaving Elsa alone and grief-stricken, but still singing cadenzas.

== Musical numbers ==
- Prelude
- Our King Is Here – Ensemble
- The Court Is Called to Order – The King
- Elsa Is Accused – Frederick and Tunite
- I'm Such a Modest Maiden – Elsa
- The Human Canary – Elsa
- The Magic Knight Is Summoned – The Herald
- Oh, Look Who's Here – Elsa and Chorus
- Ta Ta, My Dainty Little Darling – Lohengrin
- The Cake-Walk Duel – Lohengrin and Frederick
- The Confession – Ortrud

== Roles and original cast ==
- The King (A base monarch) – Frank Belcher
- Elsa (A typical grand operatic maiden in the usual distressing predicament) – Lillian Blauvelt
- Ortrud (Her contralto aunt, given to dabbling in the art of magic) – Cora Tracey
- Lohengrin (A professional rescuer of distressed maidens) – Maurice Farkoa
- The Herald (A mediaeval news announcer) – W. L. Romaine
- The Swan, Godfrey (An item in a foul conspiracy) – Lores Grimm
- Frederick (Her hen-pecked uncle) – Otis Harlan

Three knights:

- Lastnite – Billie Norton
- Tunite – Lois Ewell
- Tumaronite – Lillian deLee

== Recording ==
A recording of The Magic Knight was released with Dream City in 2006 by the Comic Opera Guild. A recording of Dream City and The Magic Knight was released in 2014 by Ohio Light Opera.
