= John Stromberg =

American songwriter

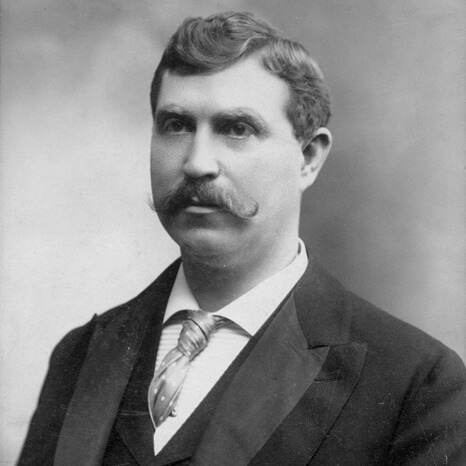
- Born: John Stramborg; 9 November 1858; Prince Edward's Isle, British North America (now Prince Edward Island, Canada)
- Died: 5 July 1902 (aged 43); New York City, United States
- Occupation: Songwriter

John Stromberg (born Stramborg, 9 November 1858 (Note: Some publishers such as the Heritage Encyclopedia of Band Music inaccurately put Stromberg's date of birth as 30 September 1853 and his date of death as 12 July 1902.) – 5 July 1902) was an American songwriter, composer, and conductor born in British Canada of Swedish ancestry (name originally "Stramborg"). He was a Freemason. He was best known for his work in collaboration with lyricist Edgar Smith on stage shows for the Weber and Fields comedy team.

== Career ==
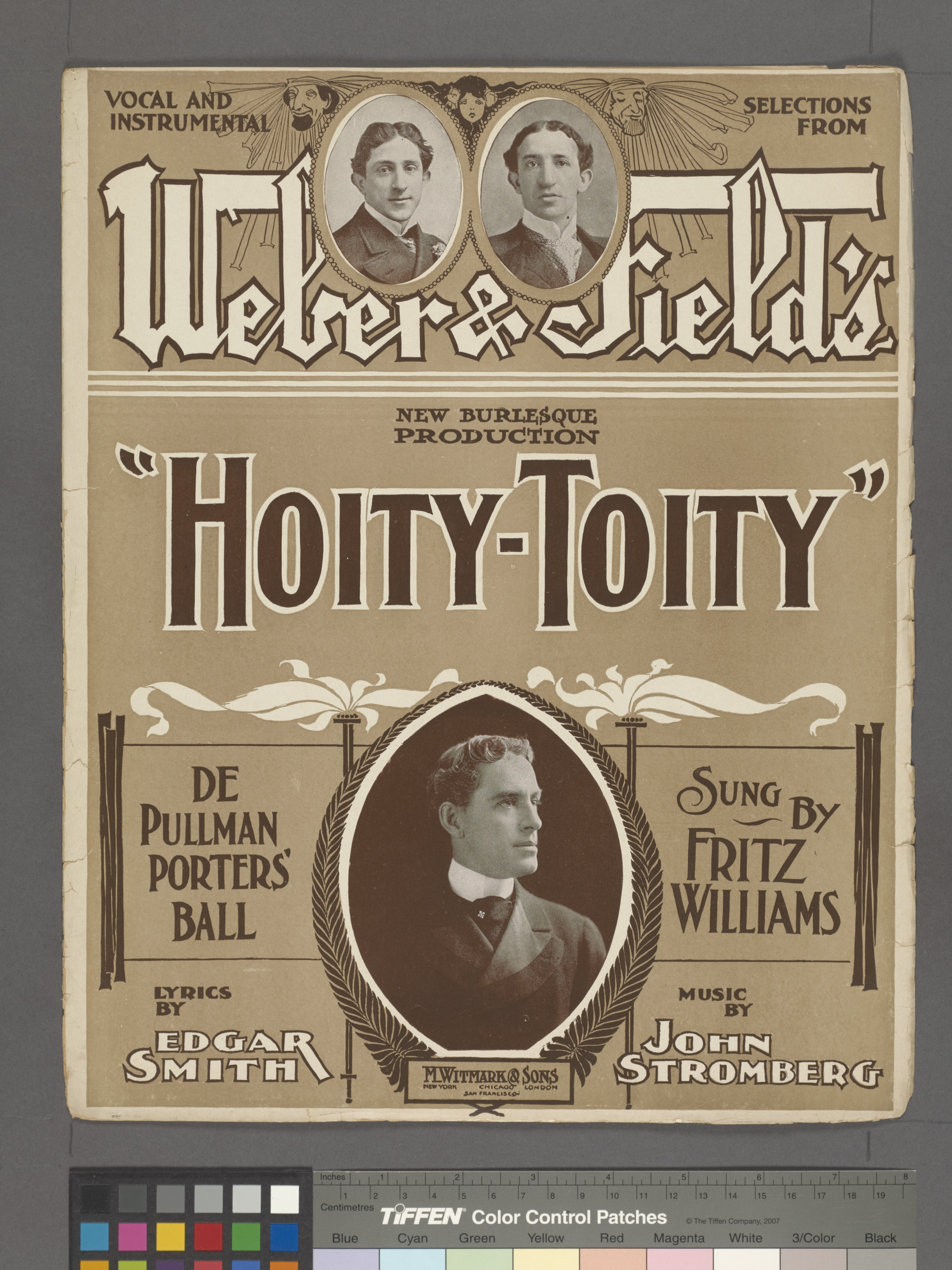

Weber and Fields began as a two-man show in the genre of ethnic (German) humor. They were a funny man/straight man comedy duo, a precursor to such famous acts as Abbott & Costello and Laurel & Hardy. They later expanded their act into the genre of vaudeville based on burlesque, musical stage shows that broadly and somewhat raucously parodied other well-known contemporary Broadway shows, without the striptease acts with which the term was later associated.

John "Honey" Stromberg, whose career began formally in Tin Pan Alley, where he worked as an arranger for the Witmark musical publishing house, was already the writer of a popular song hit ("My Girl's a Corker, She's a New Yorker") before becoming the principal composer and orchestra conductor (with Edgar Smith the principal writer) for these shows in 1896 with "The Art of Maryland," with which Weber and Fields opened their Broadway Music Hall. Stromberg wrote the scores for ten productions, conducting nine of them. His most famous composition (the lyrics, however, credited to Robert B. Smith) was "Come Down Ma Evenin' Star" from Twirly Whirly, written for the great diva of the day Lillian Russell and (as the story goes) found in the pocket of Stromberg's coat after he had committed suicide in July 1902, having ingested Paris Green insecticide. Stromberg had suffered severely from debilitating (probably rheumatoid) arthritis for several years. Contributing heavily to his troubles was the failure of his investment in "Stromberg Park," a real-estate development in Freeport, Long Island, with streets named after various Weber and Fields performers. He was greatly mourned on Broadway, and at his funeral the band struck up his famous "Come Back Ma Honey Boy to Me."

"Come Down Ma Evenin' Star" is the only song that Lillian Russell is known to have recorded. Stromberg also wrote "Ma Blushin' Rosie" (also sometimes called "Rosie You Are My Posie") which was part of the repertoire of the legendary Al Jolson, the theme song of the Rosemary Clooney TV variety show in the 1950s, and even performed in an Abbott and Costello film, The Naughty Nineties. He was one of the outstanding composers of the ragtime era, but his songs have been largely forgotten because most of the best ones were of the genre of so-called "coon songs"—the name itself contains a racial slur, and the genre consisted of songs containing the most blatant racial stereotypes expressed in a "Negro dialect" which makes them highly offensive to modern audiences. It should perhaps be mentioned that none of the lyrics are per se derogatory of blacks, and the only reference to race that occurs in them is the single line "But den [then] color's only skin-deep anyway" (in "Come Back Ma Honey Boy to Me"). Although the offensive matter is entirely contained in Edgar Smith's lyrics, not in Stromberg's music, the music has suffered badly from "guilt by association" with the racist lyrics.
