= Jaimie Warren =

American photographer and performance artist

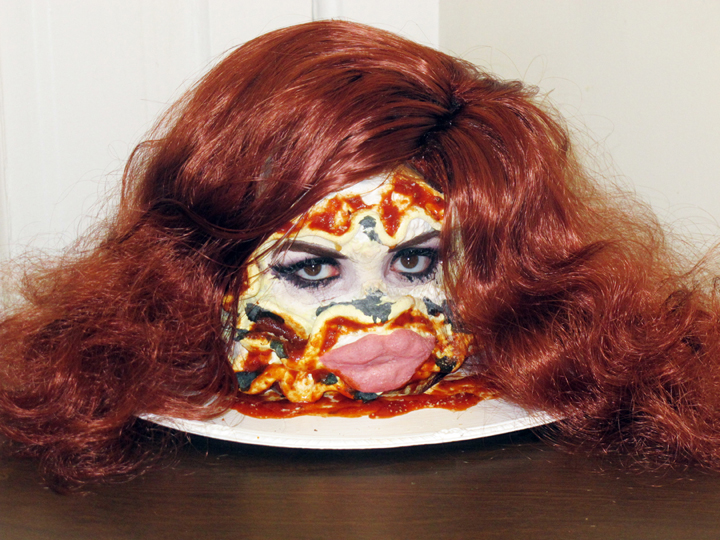
Self-portrait as Lasagna Del Rey by thestrutny, Celebrities as Food Series, 2012

Jaimie Warren (born 1980) is an American photographer and performance artist who is based in Brooklyn, New York. Warren is a fellow in Interdisciplinary Arts from the New York Foundation for the Arts, she is the recipient of the Baum Award for An Emerging American Photographer, and is a featured artist on the PBS Art:21 series “New York Close Up”.

She and artist Matt Roche are also the co-creators and co-directors of Whoop Dee Doo, a non-profit faux public access television show that creates large-scale commissioned projects for museums and festivals. Whoop Dee Doo (est. 2006) has created over 30 commissioned projects for organizations including the Smart Museum of Art (Chicago), Loyal Gallery (Sweden), The Contemporary (Baltimore, MD), among others. Whoop Dee Doo is the recipient of a 2016 Franklin Furnace Grant, a 2015 Abrons Arts Center Artist Fellowship, and was a 2016 artist-in-residence at the High Line. In 2017, Warren created a Nexus Post for the grant making Kindle Project.

From 2000 to 2012, Warren worked to aid the growth of the Kansas City, Missouri art community, curating numerous exhibitions, public events and youth-oriented programs and classes. Warren worked with and received support from organizations such as the Charlotte Street Foundation, The Lighton International Artist Exchange Program, and Studios, Inc. In 2011, Warren received a United States Presidential Scholars Program Teacher Recognition Award presented by Barack Obama in Washington, D.C. Since relocating to Brooklyn in 2013, Warren has been selected for multiple artist residencies including The Sharpe-Walentas Studio Program, BRIC Visual Artist Residency, Abrons Arts Center, and American Medium.

Warren has also been a guest artist and lead teacher in numerous New York City museums, arts institutions, arts organizations and public schools including the Brooklyn Arts Council, The Museum of Modern Art, The New York Studio Residency Program, and Art:21 Educators, among others.

== Exhibitions ==
Warren's work has appeared in many museum and gallery exhibitions, including solo exhibitions at the Kennedy Museum of Art (Athens, OH), Kemper Museum of Contemporary Art (Kansas City, MO) and at the Miami Dade College Museum of Art & Design and exhibitions at Beida University (Beijing), Ullens Center for Contemporary Art (Beijing), Showroom for Media and Moving Art (Rotterdam), Nelson-Atkins Museum of Art, (Kansas City, MO), San Diego Museum of Art, (San Diego), and Senda Gallery (Barcelona), among others.

Her work has predominantly been featured in New York, with her first solo exhibition at Higher Pictures in 2009, which was reviewed in Artforum and many other well-known publications. The Huffington Post commented on her exhibition “The WOAHS of Female Tragedy II”: “We don't know what we love most about Jaimie Warren: her knack for puns, her obsession with "Toddlers & Tiaras" or her endless devotion to Roseanne Barr...Warren, like a Reddit-crazed Cindy Sherman, inserts her self-portraits into the best and most bizarre memes, channeling everything from Picasso's "Demoiselles" to the celebrity spoof, "Lasagna Del Rey." For her second solo exhibition at the Hole in 2014, Roberta Smith writes in the New York Times: “In her latest New York exhibition, Jaimie Warren comes across as a force of nature, or at least pop culture, whose work brims with messy promise. [Her photographs] indicate a talent for color and tactility (to say the least) as well as for rough-edged transformation that combines aspects of the work of Cindy Sherman, Sandy Skoglund and Alex Bag while channeling the spirits of Leigh Bowery, Divine and George Grosz.”

== Publications ==
Warren's photography and art has been published and reviewed in a variety of publications, including The New York Times (New York). ARTnews (New York), Artforum (New York), i-D (London), Vice Magazine (New York), Complex (New York), Nylon (New York), Missbehave (New York), The Fader (New York), SPIN (New York), XLR8R (New York), URB (New York), Village Voice (New York), Foam Magazine (The Netherlands), Dossier Journal (New York), NY Arts Magazine (New York), artnet (New York and Berlin), Paper (New York), Dazed & Confused (London), Interview (New York), and Oyster (Sydney).

Warren’s first monograph Don't You Feel Better was published by Aperture in New York in 2008.

== Video and Performance Work ==
In more recent years, Jaimie's work has transitioned from low-fi photography based self-portraits to more elaborate and referential performance and video workWarren has performed at venues including the Warhol Museum (Pittsburgh), The Jewish Museum (NYC), Vox Populi (Philadelphia), Showroom Mama (Rotterdam), Getsumin (Osaka), Material (Mexico City), California Institute of the Arts (Valencia, CA), The Museum of Modern Art (MOMA) Education Department (New York, NY), and Extrapool (Nijmegen), among others.
