= 44th Street Theatre =

Broadway theater (1912–1945)

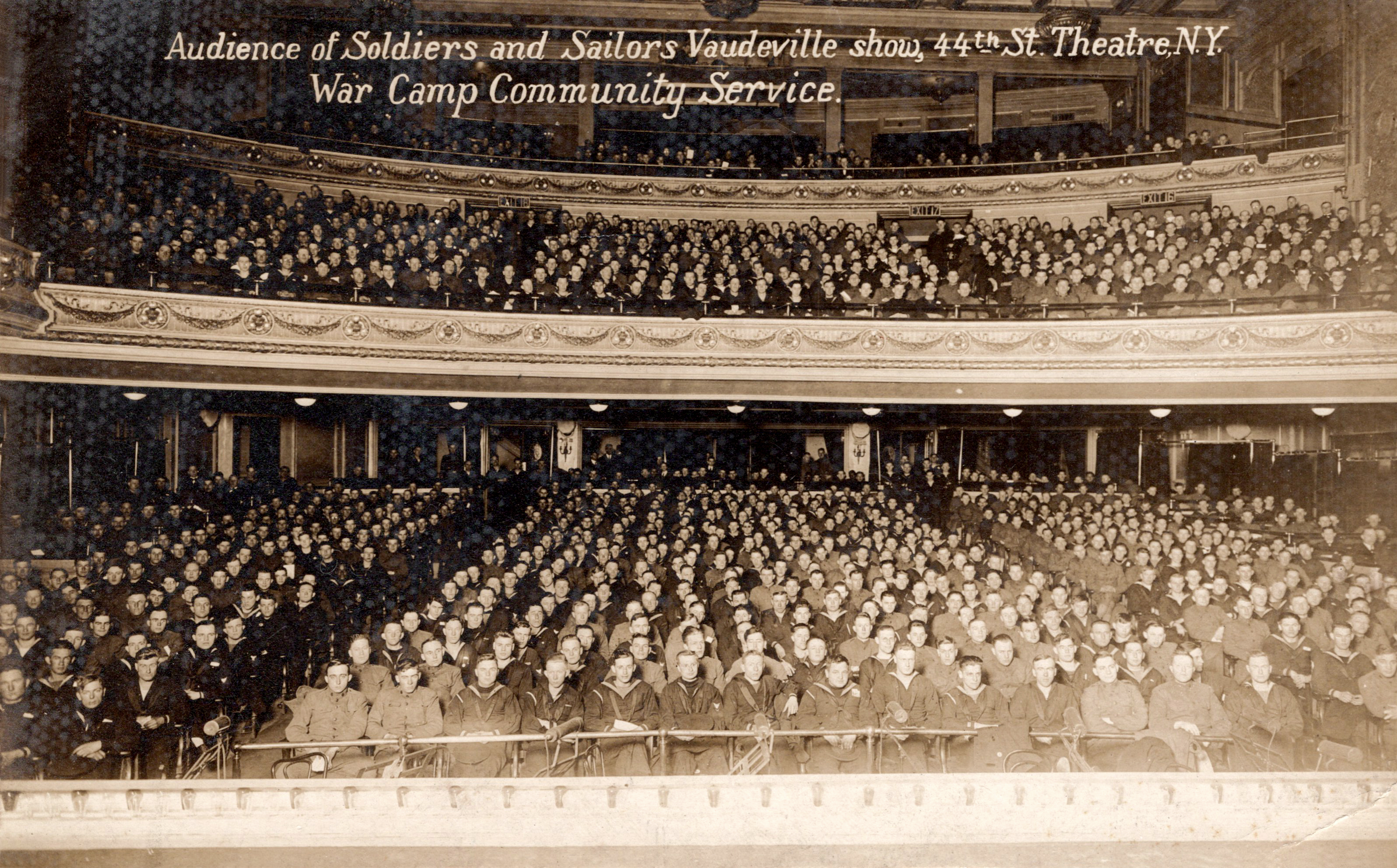
- World War I soldiers and sailors attend a free show at the 44th Street Theatre in 1918
- Interactive map of 44th Street Theatre
- Former names: Weber and Fields' Music Hall
- Address: 216 West 44th Street
- Location: Manhattan, New York City
- Owner: Shubert Organization
- Type: Broadway theatre

Construction
- Opened: 21 November 1912
- Closed: 1945
- Architect: William A. Swansea

The 44th Street Theatre was a Broadway theater at 216 West 44th Street in the Theater District of Manhattan in New York City from 1912 to 1945. It was originally named Weber and Fields' Music Hall when it opened in November 1912 as a resident venue for the comedy duo Weber and Fields, but was renamed to the 44th Street Theatre in December 1913 after their tenure at the theatre ended. It should not be confused with the Weber and Fields' Broadway Music Hall, often referred to as simply Weber and Fields' Music Hall and also known as Weber's Music Hall or Weber's Theatre, which was used by both Weber and Fields or just Weber from 1896 through 1912.

The 44th Street Theatre's rooftop theatre, the Nora Bayes Theatre, named for the singer Nora Bayes, presented many productions of the Federal Theatre Project in the mid-1930s. Its basement club became the Stage Door Canteen during World War II.

== History ==
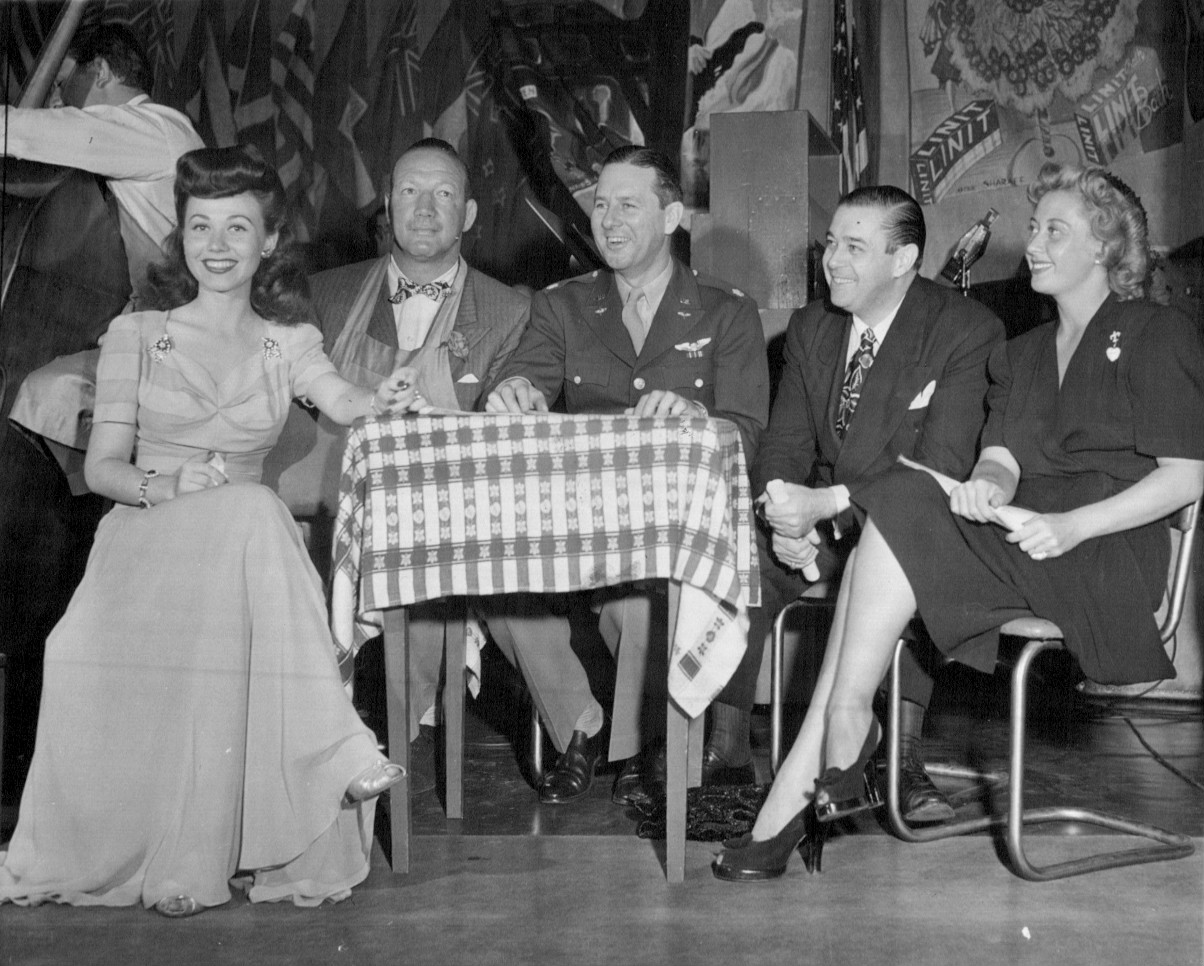
Connie Haines, Maxie Rosenbloom, Ben Lyon, Morton Downey and Joan Blondell at the Stage Door Canteen (1943)

The 44th Street Theatre was located at 216 West 44th Street in New York City. The architect was William Albert Swasey, who designed the theatre in an 18th Century Georgian style.

The 44th Street Theatre was first named Weber and Fields' Music Hall. Built by The Shubert Organization in 1912, the theatre was initially intended to be a new resident theatre for the recently reconciled comedy duo Joe Weber and Lew Fields who had not performed together for years. The pair had previously been successful on Broadway at the former Weber and Fields' Broadway Music Hall from 1896 through 1904. However, the theatre was deemed to be too large of a space for the burlesque type comedy of Weber and Fields to be successful, and the partnership with the Schuberts and their theatre was dissolved after just seven and a half weeks of performances. The theatre was renamed the 44th Street Theatre on December 29, 1913.

A theatre on the roof of the building, Lew Fields' 44th Street Roof Garden, opened on June 5, 1913 with the premiere of the E. Ray Goetz musical All Aboard; a work produced by and starring Lew Fields. It later became the Nora Bayes Theatre in 1918. In the mid-1930s it presented Federal Theatre Project shows.

In the basement of the 44th Street Theatre, the original rathskeller, became a small nightclub named the “Little Club” during Prohibition.

In 1940 the building was purchased by The New York Times Company, which leased it back to Lee Shubert. When the American Theatre Wing requested the basement club as an entertainment venue for servicemen, Shubert gave them the property without charge. In March 1942 the 40-by-80-foot club space became the original Stage Door Canteen, which operated throughout World War II, became the subject of a popular film, and inspired other canteens throughout the United States.

In 1930, the Film Daily Yearbook listed 44th Street Theatre as a movie theatre. The theatre showed films for a brief period of time before returning to stage productions. For movie screenings, the theatre had 1,468 seats, and 1 screen.

The most notable film screening of 44th Street Theatre was of the German lesbian film “Maedchen in Uniform” in 1931. The movie played for a season twice daily and three times on Sundays and holidays. The theatre boasted that they had ‘Lower prices than any other two-a-day movie on Broadway’.

In 1940, The New York Times purchased the 44th Street Theatre. After Shubert's lease expired in June 1945, the building was demolished. A New York Times printing plant was built in its place, part of the newspaper's postwar expansion of its 229 West 43rd Street headquarters. The printing plant was later abandoned, but a plaque remains to mark the location of the Stage Door Canteen.

== Notable productions ==
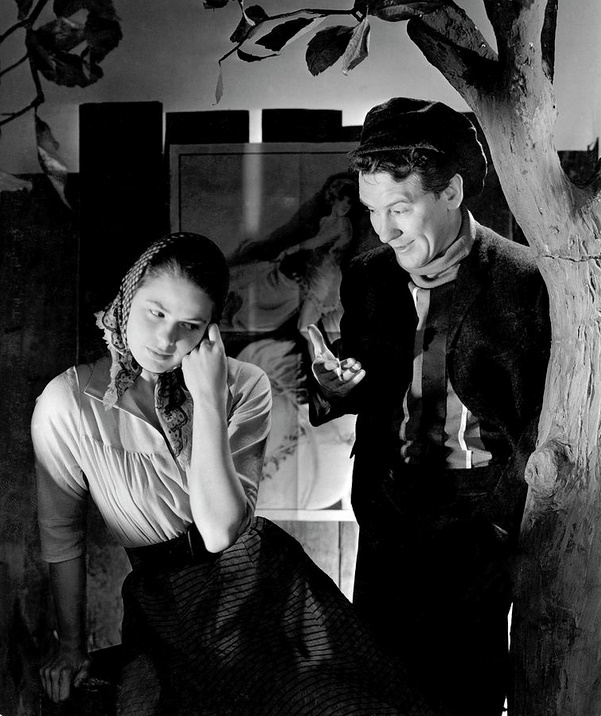
Ingrid Bergman and Burgess Meredith in Liliom (1940)

Productions staged at the 44th Street Theatre are listed at the Internet Broadway Database.

- 1913: The Girl on the Film
- 1914: The Lilac Domino
- 1915: The Peasant Girl
- 1915: Katinka
- 1916: The Blue Paradise
- 1917: Maytime
- 1919: The Greenwich Village Follies of 1919
- 1924: Six Characters in Search of an Author
- 1925: Song of the Flame
- 1927: The Five O'Clock Girl
- 1927: A Night in Spain
- 1928: Animal Crackers
- 1930: Lysistrata
- 1933: Face the Music
- 1934: Four Saints in Three Acts
- 1934: Conversation Piece
- 1940: Liliom
- 1941: The New Opera Company
- 1942: Rosalinda (Die Fledermaus)
- 1943: Winged Victory
- 1944: Yellow Jack
- 1945: On the Town
