= Spirit of Independence March =

Song
- Written: 1910s
- Songwriter(s): Abe Holzmann

"Spirit of Independence" is a song written during World War I. It was performed by The Conway's Band, with the music and lyrics written by Abe Holzmann. Based on sales estimates, the song hit a peak position of number four on the Top 100 US Songs of its time.

The song was published by Jerome H. Remick & Co. and was arranged by J.B. Lampe. The sheet music cover depicts a large eagle looking at Miss Liberty who has the Declaration of Independence and a victor's wreath.
