= Madame la Presidente =

1916 film by Frank Lloyd

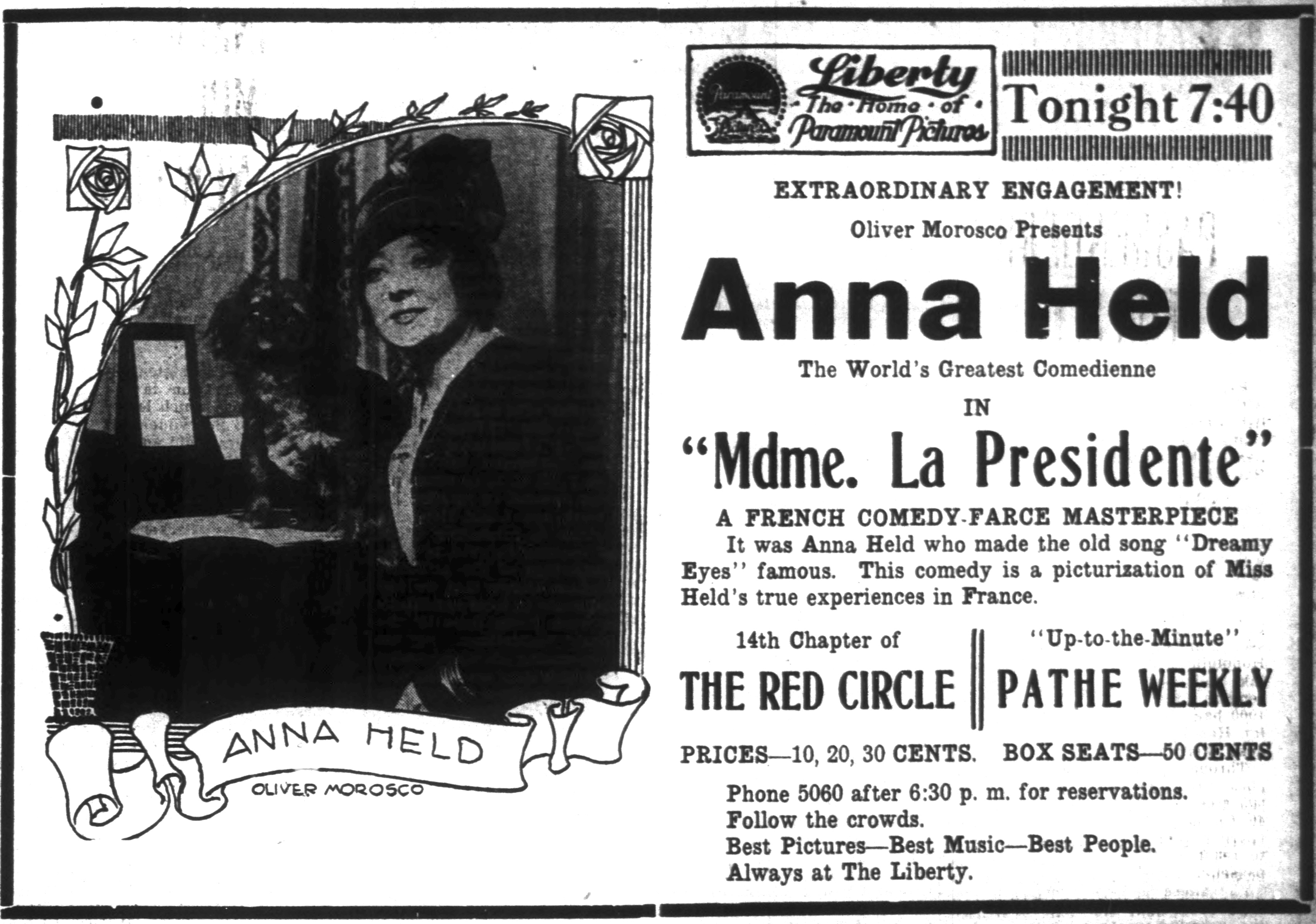
- Newspaper advertisement
- Directed by: Frank Lloyd
- Written by: Elliott J. Clawson (scenario)
- Based on: La Présidente by Maurice Hennequin and Jose G. Levy
- Produced by: Oliver Morosco
- Starring: Anna Held; Forrest Stanley
- Distributed by: Paramount Pictures
- Release date: February 6, 1916
- Running time: 5 reels
- Country: United States
- Language: Silent (English intertitles)

Madame la Presidente is a surviving 1916 American silent comedy film produced by Oliver Morosco and directed by Frank Lloyd. It was distributed by Paramount Pictures and stars Broadway legend and musical comedy star Anna Held in what would be her final and only feature-length film. The film is based on a play, Madame Presidente, that starred Fannie Ward on Broadway.

== Cast ==
- Anna Held as Mademoiselle Goberte
- Forrest Stanley as Cyprian Gaudette
- Herbert Standing as Augustin Galipaux
- Page Peters as Octave Rosimond
- Lydia Yeamans Titus as Madame Galipaux
- Helen Jerome Eddy as Denise Galipaux
- Howard Davies as Marius
- Richard L'Estrange as Lerous (credited as Dick La Strange)
- Robert Newcomb as De Berton
- Frank A. Bonn as Pinglet (credited as Frank Bonn)
- Liane Held Carrera as Nightclub Patron

== Censorship ==
Like many American films of the time, Madame la Presidente was subject to cuts by city and state film censorship boards. For example, the Ohio Board of Censors required a cut to five feet of film of a scene between woman and official in his home where her actions are suggestive, an intertitle ending in "There is life in the old dog yet," and the scene where woman and man appear in which her skirt is pulled off and later where her entire dress is removed.

== Preservation ==
A copy of Madame la Presidente is preserved at the UCLA Film and Television Archive.

== See also ==
- The President (1938)
- Mademoiselle Gobete (1952)
- La presidentessa (1977)
