= Edgar Smith (librettist) =

American librettist and lyricist (1857–1938)

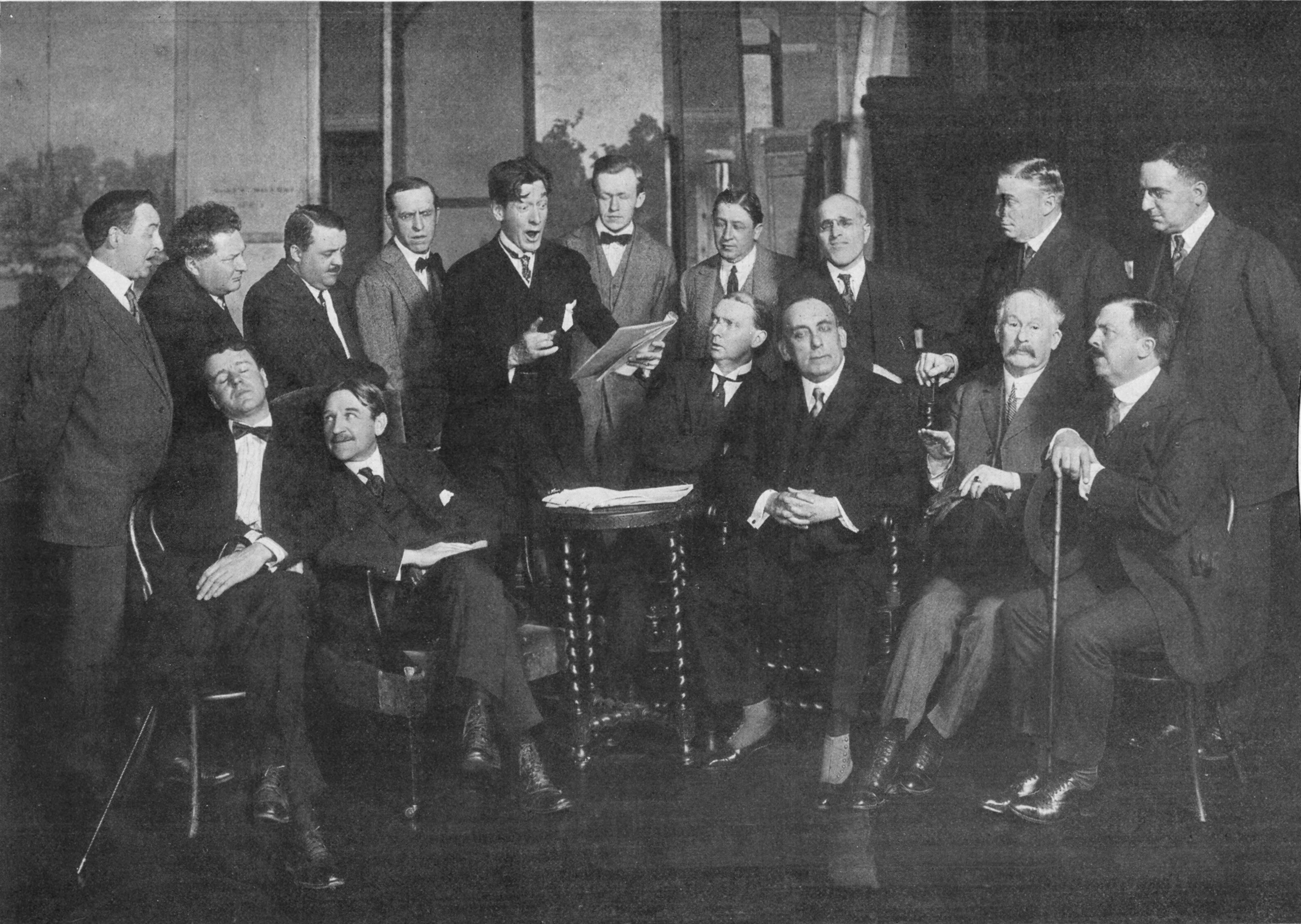
Edgar Smith (standing, second from left) and other members of The Lambs put the finishing touches on The Lambs All-Star Gambol for the benefit of the Actors' Fund (May 1915)

Edgar McPhail Smith (December 9, 1857 – March 8, 1938) was an American writer and lyricist for musicals in the early decades of the 20th century. He contributed to some 150 Broadway musicals. Weber and Fields starred in many of his works.

== Early life and career ==
Smith was born in Brooklyn, New York. After attending Pennsylvania Military Academy, Smith began his career as an actor.

His first play was a comedy-drama, Love and Duty (1879), written for Dickson's Sketch Club, a touring company that he had joined. His first musical piece was a burlesque, Little Lohengrin (1886), adapted for Alice Harrison and the Chicago Casino from the original English version. Smith wrote the song "Once in a Thousand Years" to be interpolated into The Pyramid (1887) in Boston. He became the dramaturg at New York's Casino Theatre, from 1887 to 1893, helping to adapt European operettas, and sometimes playing supporting roles, such as Dimoklos in Apollo; Grog in La Grande-Duchesse de Gérolstein; Clampas in The Drum Major; Notary in The Marquis; and Nowalksy in Der arme Jonathan (1890). In the American premiere of Gilbert and Sullivan's The Yeomen of the Guard, he played the 1st Citizen.

After leaving the Casino, Smith appeared as Dusty Rhodes in a touring burlesque, Tabasco, composed by George Whitefield Chadwick, which had a run on Broadway in 1894. The same year, Smith wrote a sequel, The Grand Vizier; a parody revue, The Merry World; and an extravaganza, Miss Philadelphia, which was a hit in the title city.

== Weber and Fields and later years ==
By the mid-1890s, Smith became a writer for Weber and Fields; often collaborating with fellow writer Louis De Lange. For more than six years, he wrote sketches and scenes for their revues, burlesques (usually of current Broadway musicals) and vaudeville entertainments, often collaborating with composer John Stromberg. One of their best known songs was "Ma Blushin' Rosie". At the same time, for E. E. Rice, he adapted for American audiences Edwardian musical comedies such as The Gay Parisienne (as The Girl from Paris (1896), including lyrics to new songs by Nat. D. Mann), The French Maid and Harry Greenbank's Monte Carlo. He also adapted Maurice Ordonneau's vaudeville-opérette L'Auberge du Tohu-bohu. His other musicals and farces during the late 1890s were less successful.

Weber and Fields dissolved in 1904, and Smith continued to write, for a few years, for Weber's Music Hall. Two pieces there with composer Victor Herbert were Dream City and another Lohengrin burlesque, The Magic Knight (both in 1906). Separately, for Fields, he played Henry Pecksniff in, and adapted, The Girl Behind the Counter (1907). In 1910 he wrote the lyrics to "Heaven Will Protect the Working Girl", from Fields's production of Tillie's Nightmare, which became his most enduring song.

Weber and Fields reunited in 1912, and Smith wrote new shows for them: Hokey-Pokey, Hanky-Panky and Roly Poly. Beginning in 1915, many of his shows were for the Shubert family, adapting European musicals for American audiences. His last work was an American version of Das Land des Lächelns in 1930.

Smith died at age 80 at his home in Brooklyn.

== Notable books and libretti ==
- Whoop-Dee-Doo 1903 (also lyrics)
- Higgledy-Piggledy 1904
- Dream City 1906 (also lyrics)
- The Magic Knight 1906 (libretto)
- The Girl Behind the Counter 1907 (freely adapted and reconstructed by Smith)
- Hip! Hip! Hooray! 1907
- La Belle Paree 1911
- The Peasant Girl 1914
- The Blue Paradise 1915
- Robinson Crusoe, Jr. 1916
- Oh, What A Girl! 1919
- The Whirl of New York 1921 (also lyrics)

== Sources ==
- Gänzl, Kurt (1986). The British Musical Theatre. Vol. 1. Macmillan Press. ISBN 0-19-520509-X
- Gänzl, Kurt (1994). The Encyclopedia of the Musical Theatre (2 vols.). Blackwell/Schirmer. ISBN 0-02-864970-2
