= Higgledy-Piggledy =

Broadway musical

Higgledy-Piggledy is a musical in two acts with music by Maurice Levi and both book and lyrics by Edgar Smith. It was produced by Florenz Ziegfeld Jr. and Joseph M. Weber, and written as a starring vehicle for Ziegfeld's longtime romantic companion, the actress Anna Held, and for vaudevillian comedian Joe Weber who had recently split from his comedic partnership with Lew Fields. While critical responses to the production overwhelmingly cited the felt absence of Lew Fields and the difficulty of Weber's persona coping with that loss, the work was still a popular success and well received largely due to the actress Marie Dressler who gave a highly lauded star making performance in the role of Philopena Schnitz that propelled the show through a relatively long run on Broadway and on tour.

== Performance history ==
Higgledy-Piggledy premiered in Rochester, New York at the Lyceum Theatre on October 10, 1904. After further tryout performances in Rochester and Buffalo, the work made its Broadway debut at Weber's Music Hall on October 20, 1904. A popular success, the musical ran for 185 performances; closing on March 25, 1905. It then toured nationally with success before returning to Weber and Fields' Music Hall for further performance in August and September 1905. George F. Marion directed the musical, and Sam Marion choreographed it. The costumes were designed by Caroline Siedle and the sets were designed by John H. Young and Ernest Albert.

The Aldwych Theatre brought Dressler to London's West End for a staging of the work at that theatre in February and March 1909.

== Bibliography ==
- Dietz, Dan (2022). "Higgledy-Piggledy". The Complete Book of 1900s Broadway Musicals. Rowman & Littlefield Publishers. ISBN 9781538168943.
- Wearing, J. P. (2014). The London Stage 1900-1909: A Calendar of Productions, Performers, and Personnel. Rowman & Littlefield.
