= Anna Held =

Broadway stage performer (1872–1918)

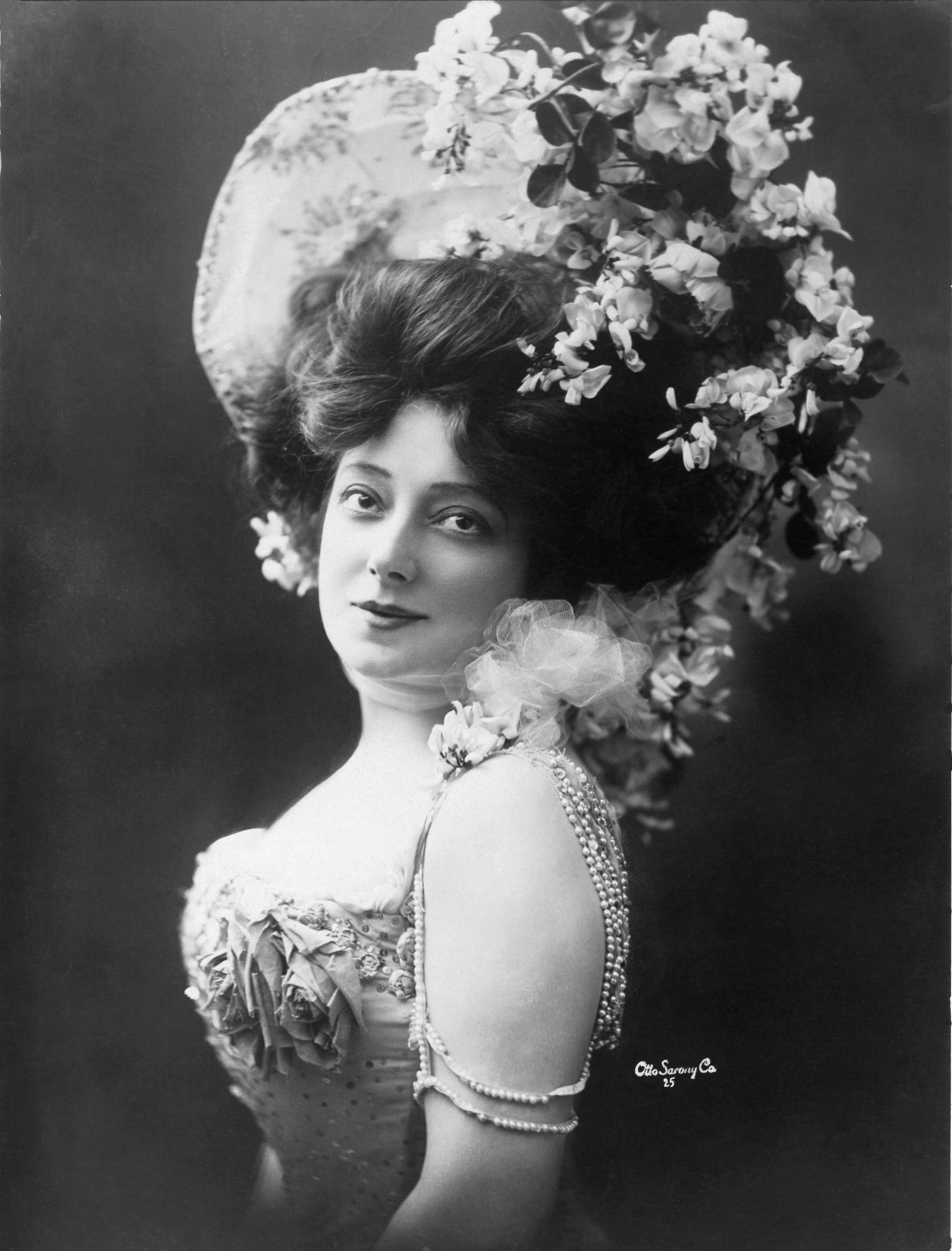
- Born: Helene Anna Held; 19 March 1872; Warsaw, Congress Poland
- Died: 12 August 1918 (aged 46); New York City, U.S.
- Resting place: Gate of Heaven Cemetery
- Occupations: Actress; singer
- Spouse(s): Maximo Carrera (m. 1894; div. 1897) Florenz Ziegfeld Jr. (m. 1897; div. 1913)
- Children: Liane Held Carrera (1895–1988) Actress/Producer

Helene Anna Held (19 March 1872 – 12 August 1918) was a Polish-born French stage performer of Jewish origin on Broadway. While appearing in London, she was spotted by impresario Florenz Ziegfeld, who brought her to America as his common-law wife. From 1896 through 1910, she was one of Broadway's most celebrated leading ladies, presented in a succession of musicals as a charming, coquettish Parisian singer and comedienne, with an hourglass figure and an off-stage reputation for exotic behavior, such as bathing in 40 gallons of milk a day to maintain her complexion. Detractors implied that her fame owed more to Ziegfeld's promotional flair than to any intrinsic talent, but her audience allure was undeniable for over a decade, with several of her shows setting house attendance records for their time. Her uninhibited style also inspired the long-running series of popular revues, the Ziegfeld Follies.

== Early life ==
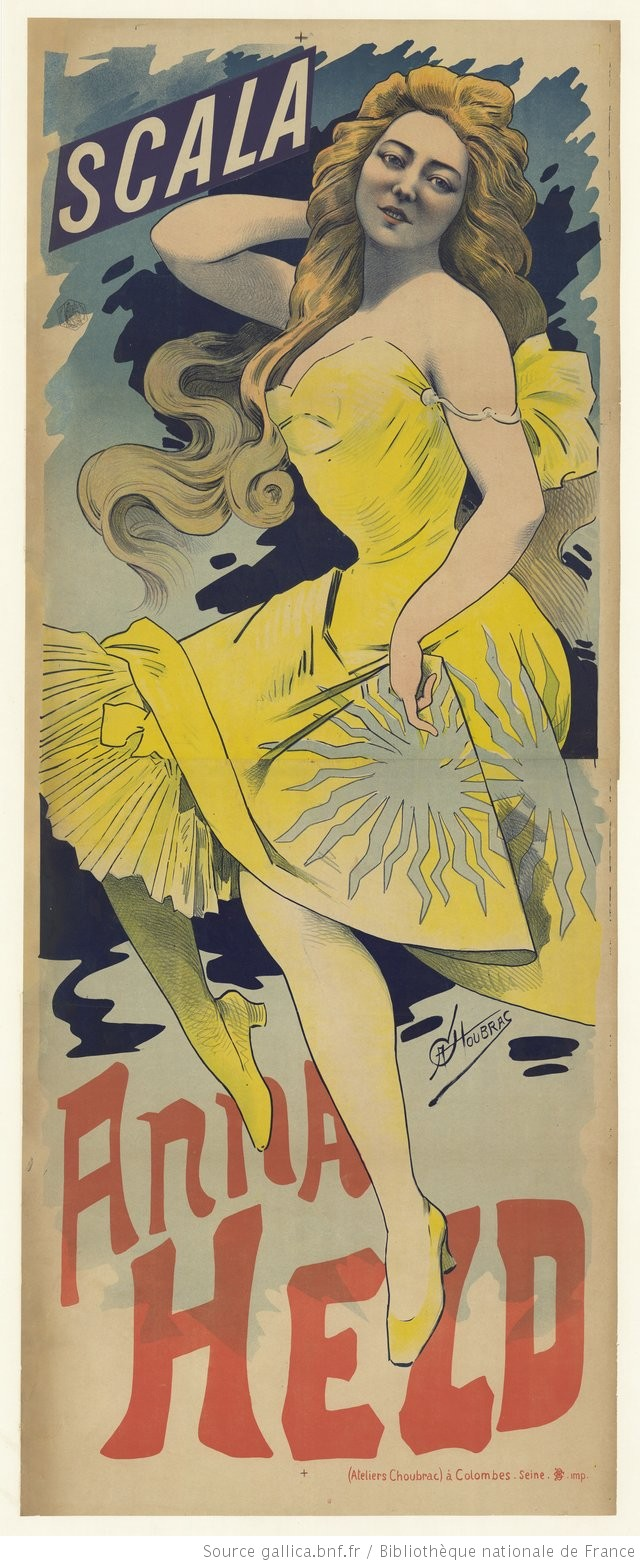
Anna Held at the Scala (Paris), poster by Alfred Choubrac (1890).

Born in Warsaw, Held was named Helene Anna Held, daughter of a German Jewish glove maker, Shimmle (aka Maurice) Held, and his French-Jewish wife, Yvonne Pierre.

Sources list a variety of birth years, ranging from 1865 to 1873, but 1872 has been accepted in general. In 1881, anti-Semitic pogroms forced the family to flee to Paris. When her father's glove manufacturing business failed, he found work as a janitor, while her mother operated a kosher restaurant. Held began working in the garment industry, then found work as a singer in Jewish theatres in Paris and, later, after her father's death, London, where her roles included the title role in a production by Jacob Adler of Abraham Goldfaden's Shulamith; she was also in Goldfaden's ill-fated Paris troupe, whose cashier stole their money before they ever played publicly.

As a young woman in France, Held converted to Roman Catholicism.

== Career ==
=== Early years ===
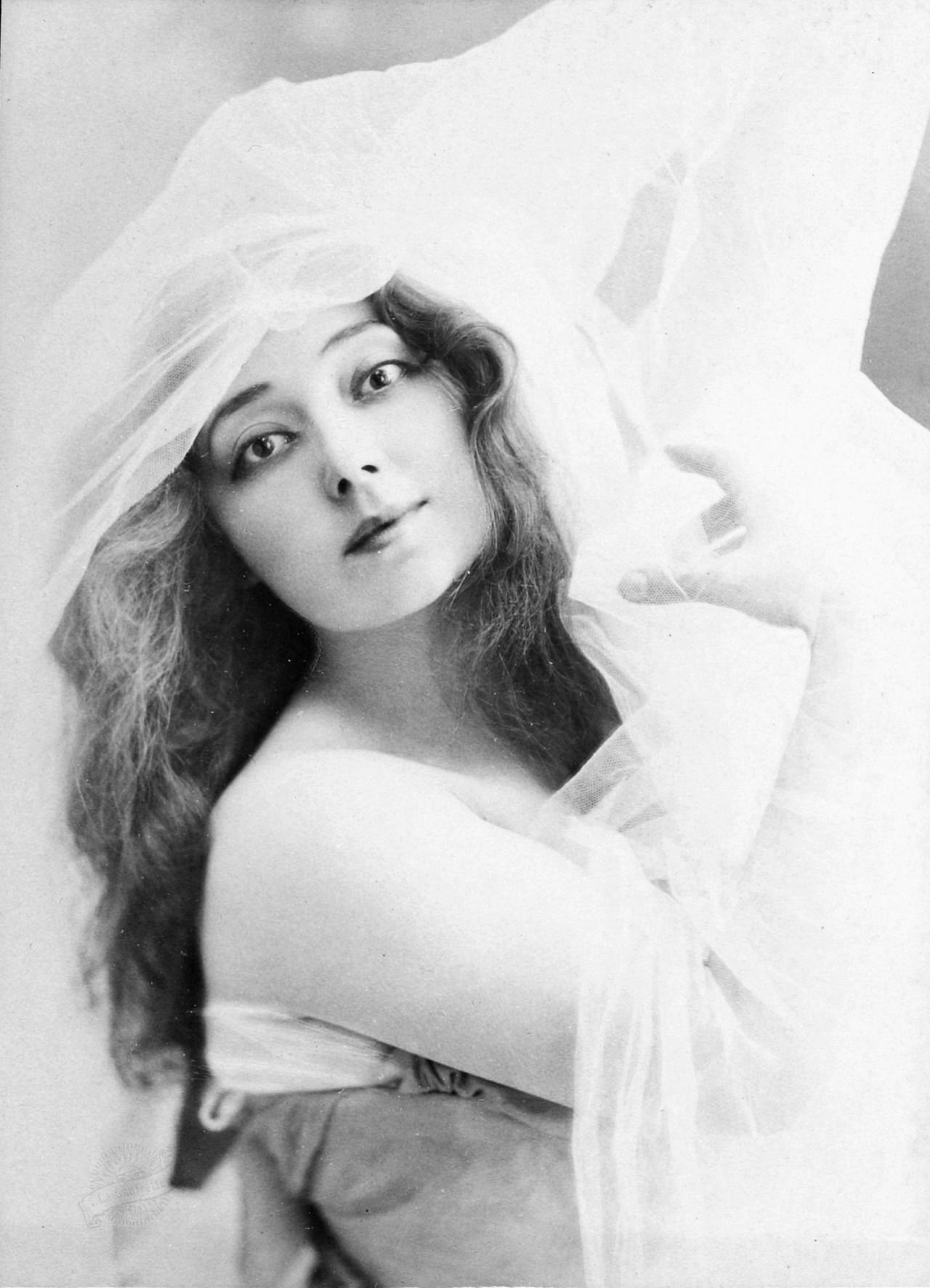
Portrait of Held c. 1908, by Léopold-Émile Reutlinger

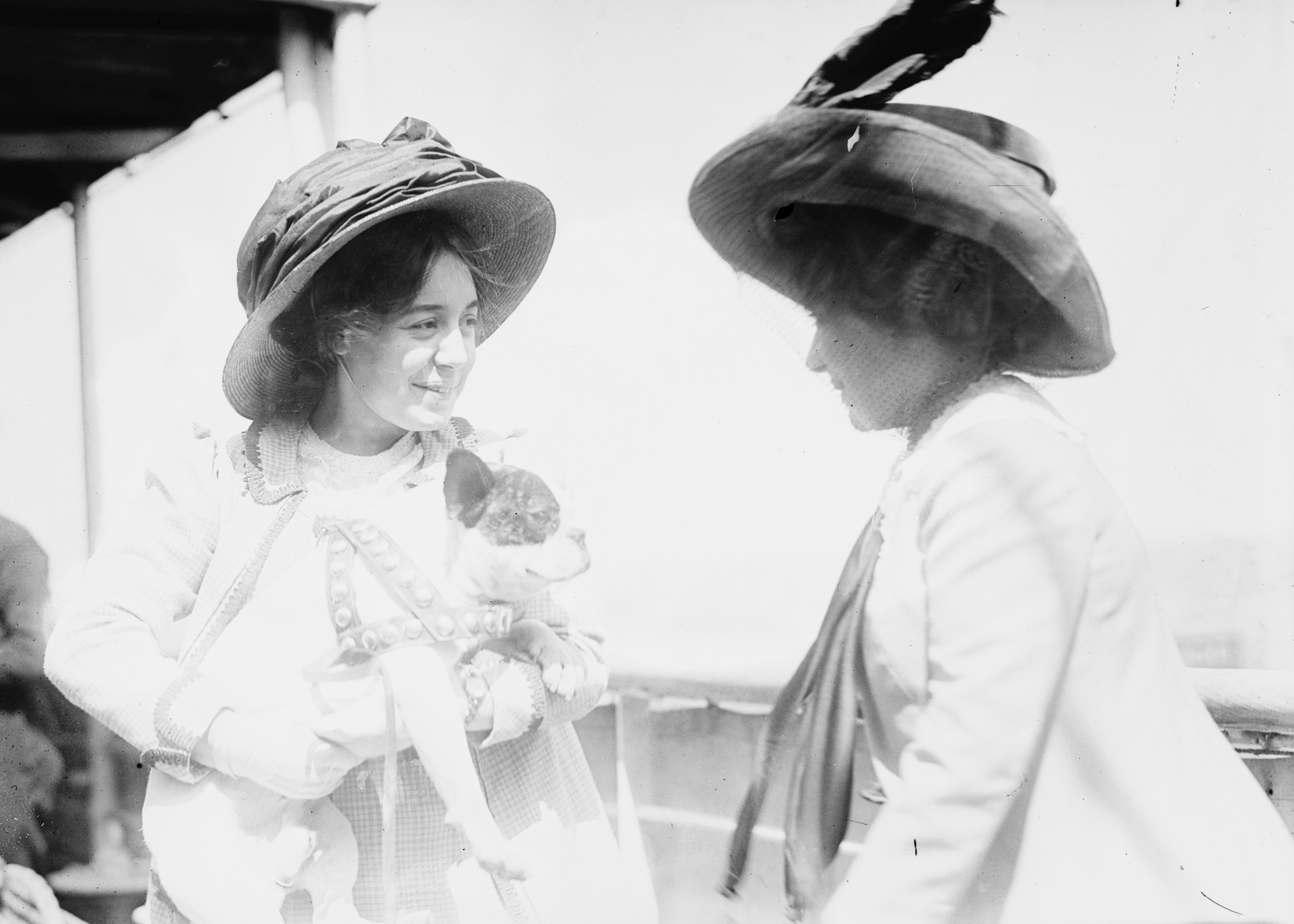
Held and her daughter, Lianne

Her vivacious and animated personality proved popular and her career as a stage performer gained momentum as she became known for her risqué songs, flirtatious nature and willingness to show her legs on stage. In 1894, she married the much-older Uruguayan playboy Maximo Carrera, with whom she had a daughter, Lianne (1895–1988), who was also an actress and producer, sometimes billed as Anna Held Jr.

Touring through Europe, Held was appearing in London in 1896, when she met Florenz Ziegfeld, who asked her to return to New York City with him. He set about creating a wave of public interest in her, feeding stories to the American press, such as her having had ribs surgically removed. By the time Held and Ziegfeld arrived in New York, she was already the subject of intense public speculation. When she finally performed in a revival of A Parlor Match, the critics were dismissive, but the public approved.

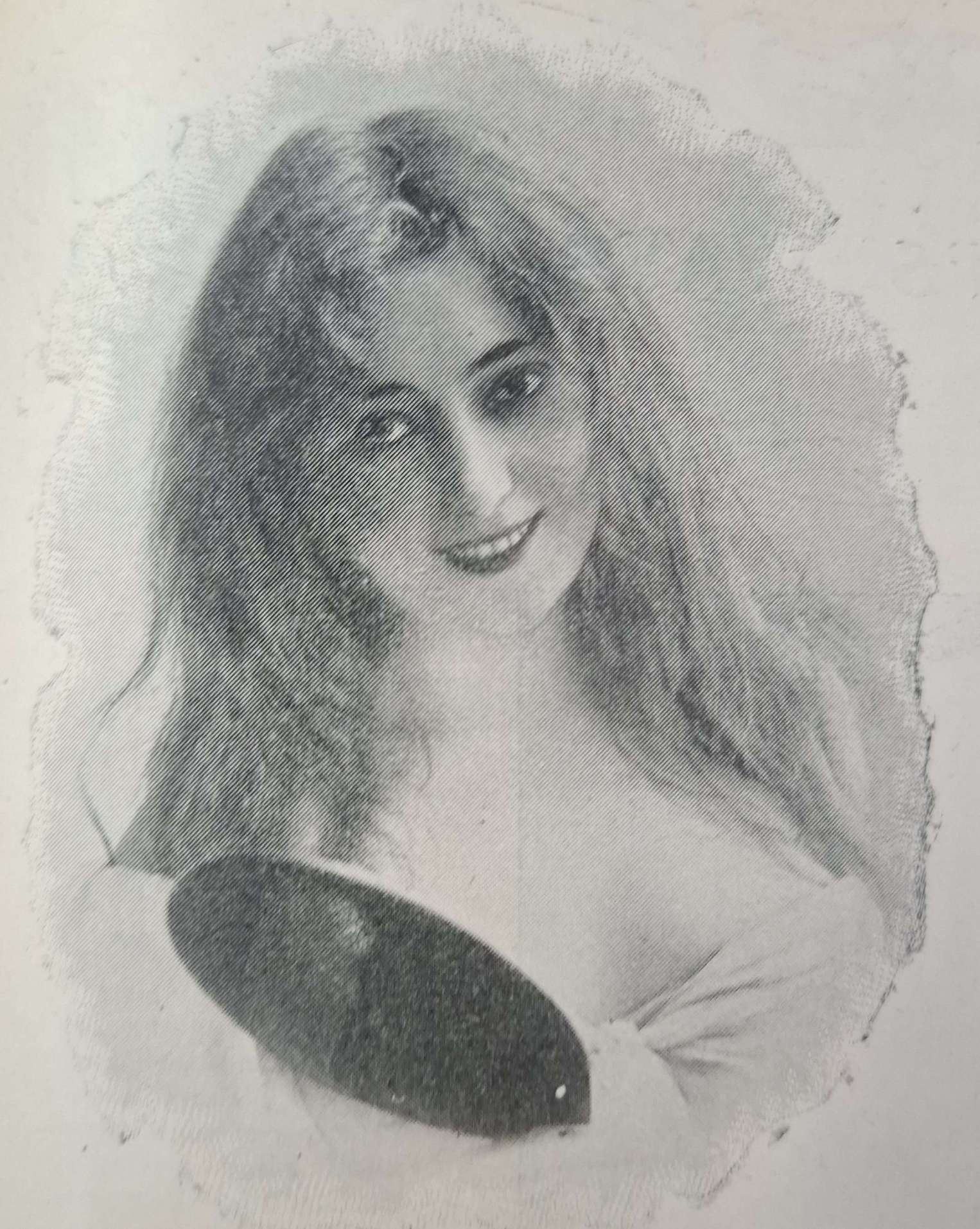
Photo of Anna Held as seen in the Black and White Budget, 15 December 1900.

=== Broadway success ===
Held, in a publicity photo

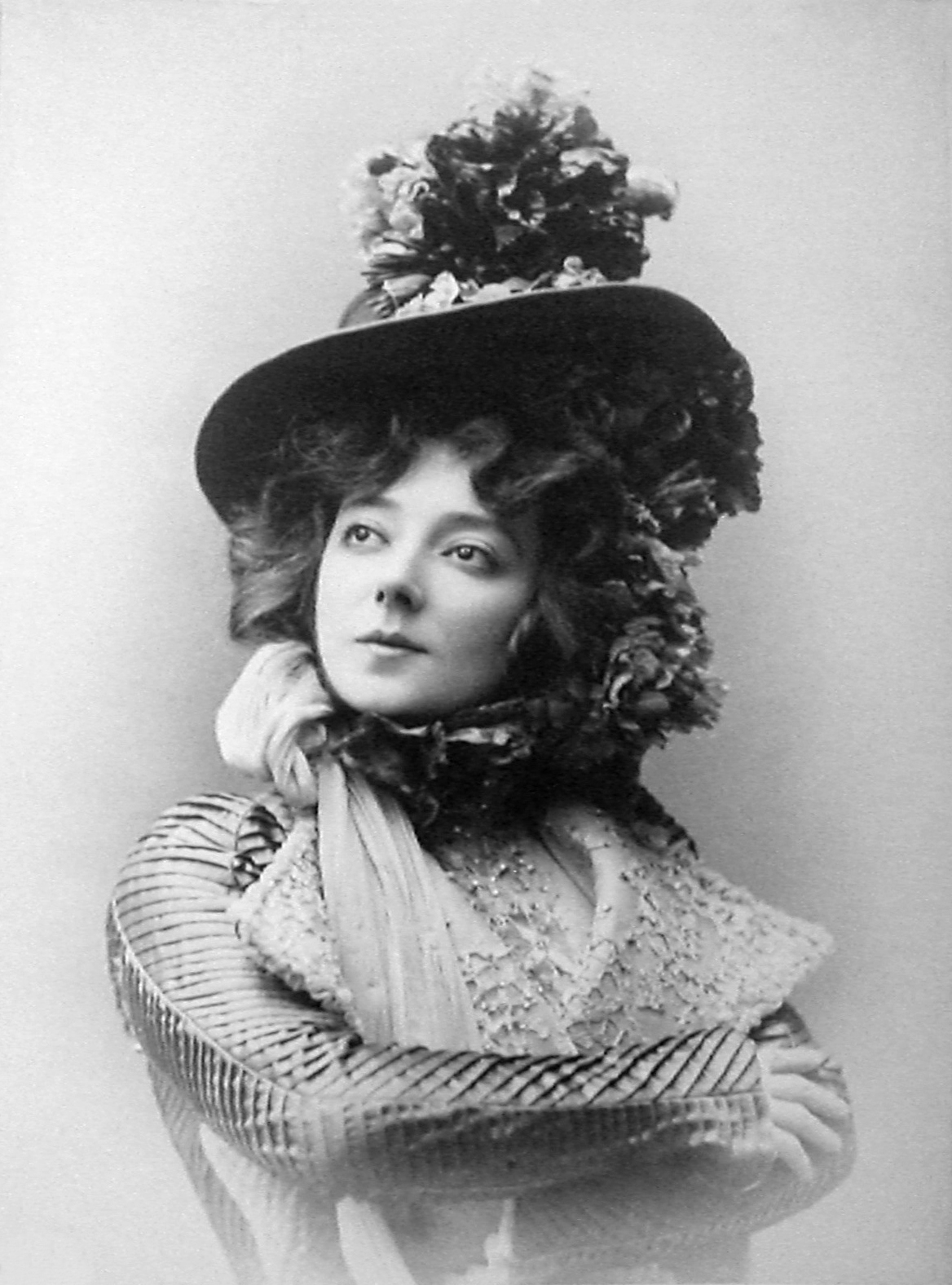
Anna Held, by Aimé Dupont

David Monod of Wilfrid Laurier University has suggested that Held succeeded more on image than talent, the illusion she presented to post-Victorian era audiences who were beginning to explore new social freedoms. From 1896, Held enjoyed several successes on Broadway, including The Little Duchess (1901) and A Parisian Model (1906–1907). These, apart from bolstering Ziegfeld's fortune, made her a millionaire in her own right. Ziegfeld's talent for creating publicity stunts ensured that Held's name remained well known.

Held influenced the format for what would eventually become the famous Ziegfeld Follies in 1907, and she helped Ziegfeld establish the most lucrative phase of his career. Held could not perform in the first Follies when she became pregnant by Ziegfeld in late 1908. Held's daughter Lianne later claimed in her unpublished memoirs that Ziegfeld forced Held to have an abortion because he did not want her pregnancy interfering with Miss Innocence, a show in which she would star in 1908–09. The claim was repeated in an autobiography by Held entitled Anna Held and Flo Ziegfeld, however, Richard and Paulette Ziegfeld, (authors of The Ziegfeld Touch) concluded that Held never wrote her memoirs, and Lianne was the real author of the autobiography. Eve Golden, Held's biographer, wrote that Lianne's abortion claim was likely a lie designed to demonize Ziegfeld, whom Lianne loathed.

In 1909, Ziegfeld began an affair with the actress Lillian Lorraine; Held remained hopeful that his fascination would pass, and he would return to her, but instead he turned his attentions to another actress, Billie Burke, whom he married in 1914.

=== Film ===
New York entertainment entrepreneur Oliver Morosco cast Held in the lead for Madame la Presidente in 1916. According to an interview she gave to Hector Ames for Motion Picture Classic, she was paid $25,000 for her performance.

== Later years and death ==
After Miss Innocence, Held left Broadway. She spent the years of World War I working in vaudeville and touring France, performing for French soldiers and raising money for the war effort. She was considered a war heroine for her contributions, and was highly regarded for the courage she displayed in traveling to the front lines, to be where she could do the most good.

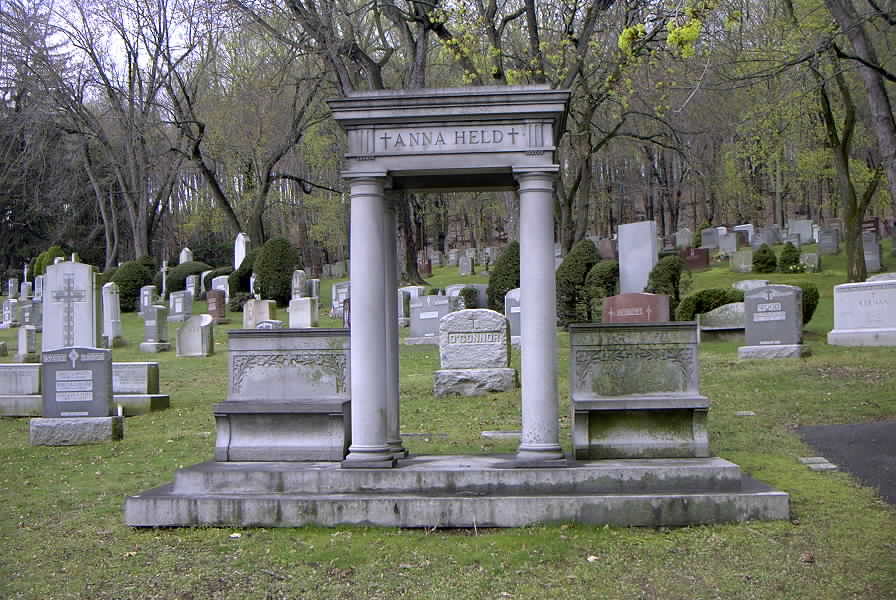
Held's grave in Gate of Heaven Cemetery

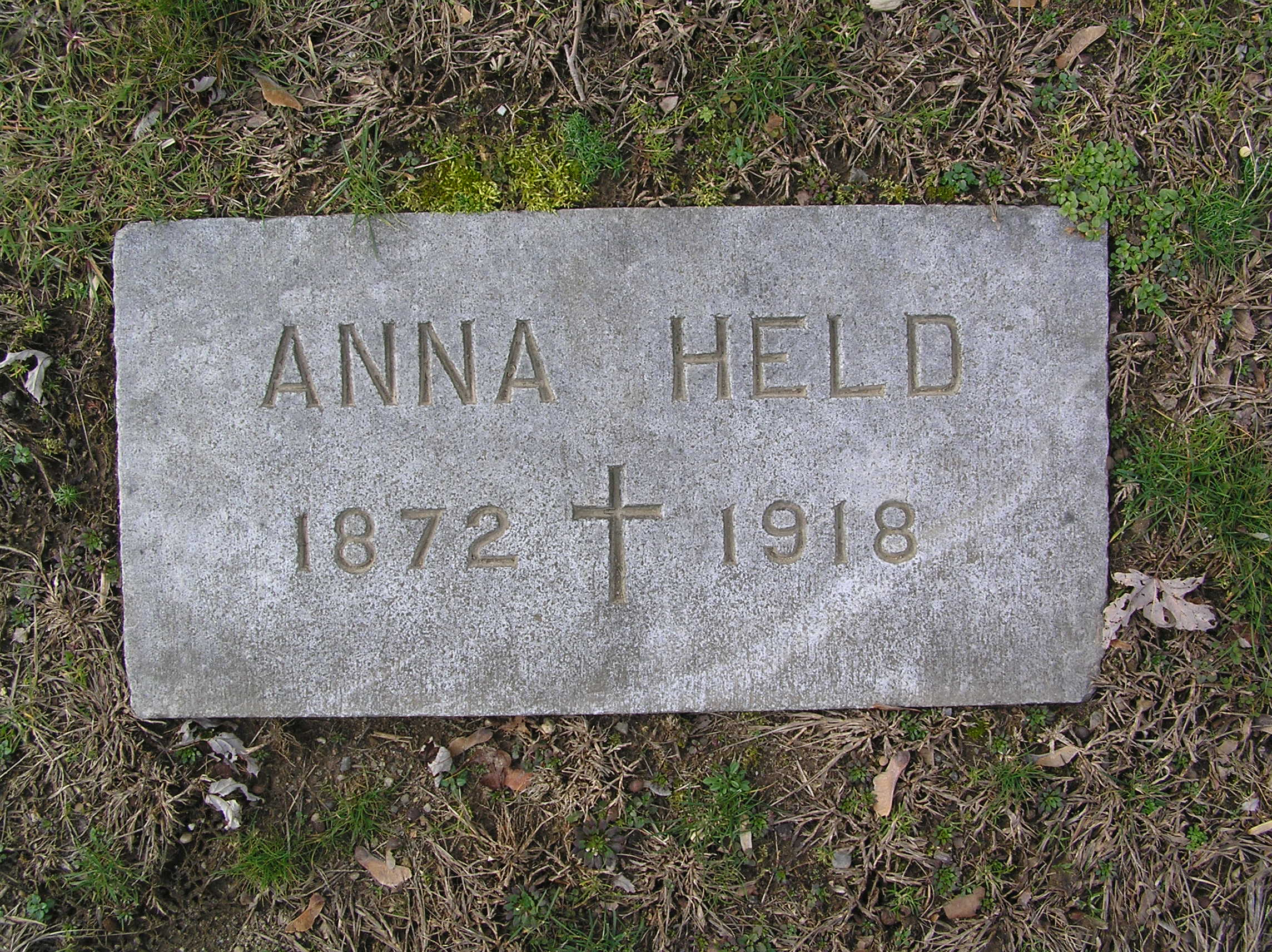
Held's footstone

The year 1917 was one of constant touring for Held; she toured the United States in a production of Follow Me until ill health caused her to close the show in January 1918. She then checked into the Hotel Savoy in New York City where her health continued to decline. Held had been battling multiple myeloma, a cancer of plasma cells, for a year. News coverage began reporting that it had been caused by her practice of excessive lacing of her corsets to give her a tiny waist.

According to the Washington Times, Held had been in and out of consciousness for about a week. On 12 August 1918, her doctor pronounced her dead, and the media was alerted. Approximately two hours later, Held revived, and the media notified she was still alive, only to have Held finally die shortly thereafter.

Held's funeral was held at St. Patrick's Cathedral in Manhattan on 14 August. Florenz Ziegfeld did not attend; he had a phobia about death and never attended funerals. Held is interred at the Gate of Heaven Cemetery in Hawthorne, New York.

== Legacy ==
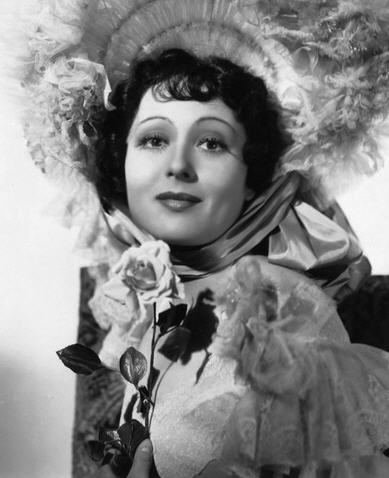
Luise Rainer in her Academy Award portrayal of Held in The Great Ziegfeld (1936)

- The MGM film The Great Ziegfeld (1936) tells a sanitized version of the Ziegfeld-Held relationship. Luise Rainer won an Academy Award for Best Actress for her performance as Held. Ziegfeld and Burke were played by William Powell and Myrna Loy.
- In 1978, Columbia Pictures released a made-for-television film on NBC, Ziegfeld: The Man and His Women. Held was portrayed by Barbara Parkins.
- The American poet Carl Sandburg wrote a memorial poem for Anna Held, An Electric Sign goes Dark, in the collection Smoke and Steel.
- In 1976, Held's daughter Lianne Carrera opened a museum of her mother's personal and stage items in San Jacinto, California.

== Stage ==
Broadway credits of Anna Held
Year	Title	Role	Theatre	Produced by	Ref(s)
1896	A Parlor Match	—	Herald Square Theatre	Florenz Ziegfeld Jr.	
1897	The French Maid	Suzette	Herald Square Theatre	Florenz Ziegfeld Jr. and Charles E. Evans	
1897	La poupée	Alesia	Olympia Theatre	Oscar Hammerstein I	
1899–1900	Papa's Wife	Anna	Manhattan Theatre	Florenz Ziegfeld Jr.	
1901–02	The Little Duchess	The Little Duchess	Casino Theatre; Grand Opera House	Florenz Ziegfeld Jr.	
1903–04	Mam'selle Napoleon	Mademoiselle Mars	Knickerbocker Theatre	Florenz Ziegfeld Jr.	
1904–05	Higgledy-Piggledy	Mimi de Chartreuse	Weber's Music Hall	Florenz Ziegfeld Jr. and Joseph M. Weber	
1907–08	A Parisian Model	Anna	Broadway Theatre	Florenz Ziegfeld Jr. and Frank McKee	
1908–09	Miss Innocence	Anna, Miss Innocence	New York Theatre	Florenz Ziegfeld Jr.	
1913–14	Anna Held's All Star Variete Jubilee	Self	Casino Theatre	John Cort	
1916–17	Follow Me	Claire LaTour	Casino Theatre	Lee Shubert and Jacob J. Shubert	

== Filmography ==
Year	Title	Role	Notes
1901	Anna Held	Herself	Close-up version Short subject
1901	Anna Held	Herself	Full-length version Short subject
1910	The Comet		Short subject
1913	Elevating an Elephant	Herself	Short subject
1913	Popular Players Off the Stage	Herself	Short subject
1916	Madame la Presidente	Mademoiselle Gobette	
