= Hiawatha (A Summer Idyl) =

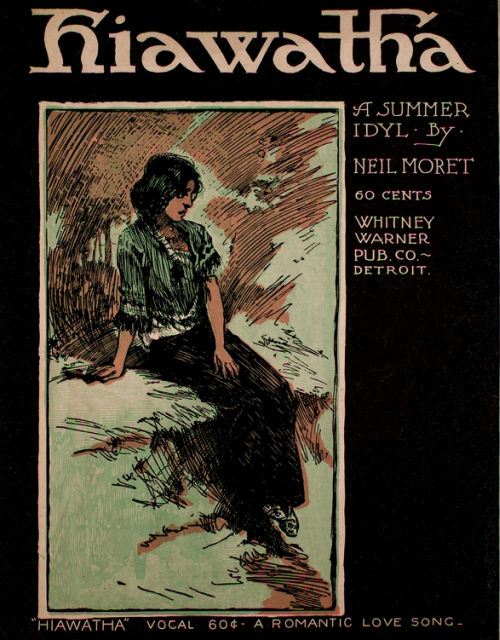
- Sheet music cover, 1902

Song
- Written: 1901, 1903 (lyrics)
- Composer(s): Neil Moret a.k.a. Charles N. Daniels
- Lyricist(s): James J. O'Dea

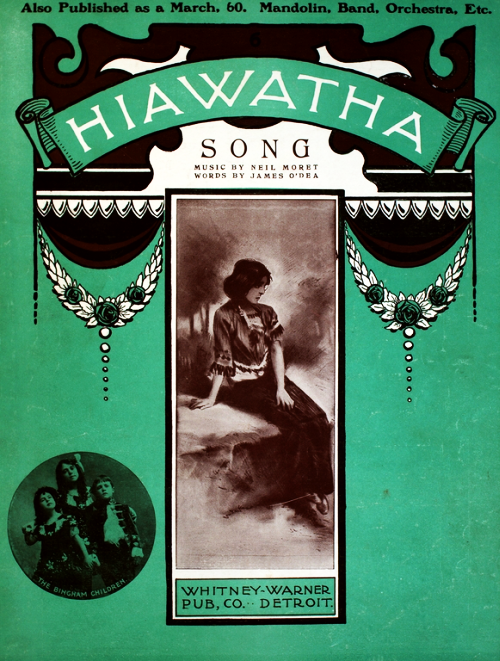
Cover of vocal version (1903).

"Hiawatha (A Summer Idyl)" is a song written by Neil Moret (Charles N. Daniels) in 1901. James J. O'Dea (1870–1914) added lyrics in 1903 and the music was re-subtitled "(His Song to Minnehaha)".

"Hiawatha" sold half a million copies after release. It has been recorded numerous times and started a decade long fad for "Indian" songs.

"Hiawatha" was named for Hiawatha, Kansas, not for Longfellow's poem.

== Lyrics ==
The lyrics as written by O'Dea:

Oh the moon is all agleam on the stream
Where I dream here of you my pretty Indian maid.
While the rustling leaves are singing high above us overhead
In the glory of the bright summer night
In light of the shadows of the forest glade
I am waiting here to kiss your lips so red.
There's a flood of melodies on the breeze
From the trees and of you they breathe so tenderly
While the woodlands all around are resounding your name,
Oh my all in life is you only you
Fond and true and your own forevermore I'll be.
Hear then the song I sing with lips aflame.

Refrain:
I am your own your Hiawatha brave – my heart is yours you know
Dear one I love you so
Oh Minnehaha gentle maid decide – decide and you'll be,
My Indian bride.

In the tresses of your hair, lies a snare and it's there
Where my heart a willing captive is.
Oh my woodland queen I pray you'll hold it ever in your care
In my little birch canoe love with you
Just we two down the stream of life in wedded bliss
I would drift sweetheart with you my lot to share.
When the birds upon the wing in the spring
Gaily sing of the green and golden summer time
When the snows of early winter robe the woodlands in white,
Then your Hiawatha free I will be
And to thee ev'ry thought of mine will o'er incline.
Heed then the vows I pledge to thee this night.
(Refrain)

== Bibliography ==
- Jasen, David A. Tin Pan Alley: An Encyclopedia of the Golden Age of American Song. New York: Routledge (2003).
- Moret, Neil (m.). "Hiawatha (A Summer Idyl)" (Sheet music). Detroit: Whitney-Warner Pub. Co. (1902).
- O'Dea, James J. (w.) (1870–1914); Moret, Neil (m.). "Hiawatha (His Song to Minnehaha)" (Sheet music). Detroit: Whitney-Warner Pub. Co. (1903).
- Sanjek, Russell. American Popular Music and Its Business: The First four Hundred Years, Vol. II. New York: Oxford University Press (1988).
- Parlor Songs 1800-1920 (Aug 2000). ">Parlor Songs Association.
