= Abe Holzmann =

American composer (1874–1939

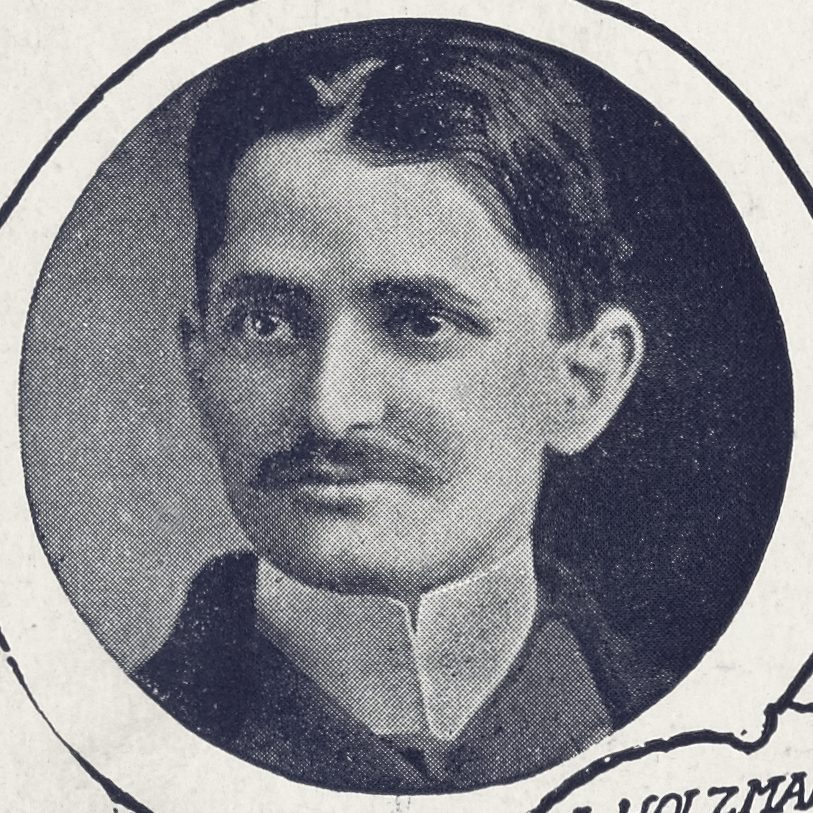
1901 portrait of Holzmann

Abraham Holzmann (19 August 1874 – 16 January 1939) was an American composer, famous for his march "Blaze Away!".

== Life and career ==
Abraham Holzmann was born in New York City on 19 August 1874. His parents were Jacob Holzmann, a Hungarian-Jewish immigrant and Isabella Holzmann, a native of Louisiana. The young Holzmann learned music in Germany. A review originally published by the New York Herald on Sunday, 13 January 1901, entitled German Composer who Writes American Cakewalk Music describes "[h]is knowledge of bass and counterpoint is thorough, and his standard compositions bear the stamp of harmonic lore, which makes his proclivity for the writing of the popular style of music the more remarkable."

Abe married Isabelle Fishblatt around 1908, and he became the manager of the Orchestra Department at Jerome Remick & Company, music publisher in New York. He was an early member (1923) of the American Society of Composers, Authors and Publishers (ASCAP). He earned his livelihood as composer/arranger for Tin Pan Alley publishers, including Leo Feist. He later was advertising manager for the American Federation of Musicians publication, International Musician. He was a member of Freemasonry, the Elks, and Knights of Pythias, all in New York City.

Holzmann died in East Orange, New Jersey at age 64 on 16 January 1939. He was survived by his widow, a daughter Natalie Holzmann, three half-brothers, and four sisters. His music was especially revered by ragtime enthusiasts, although he composed marches, waltzes, and other light music.

His 1899 composition Smokey Mokes was briefly featured in the 1936 movie San Francisco.

== Works ==
- A-la-carte (1915)
- Alagazam (1902)
- Blaze-Away! (1901) - the title refers to the Battle of Manila Bay (1898), where Commodore George Dewey said to Captain George Gridley of the U.S.S. Olympia, "You may fire when ready, Gridley!" In turn, Gridley passed the order on to his gunnery crew, saying, "Well boys, let's blaze away!" <https://en.wikipedia.org/wiki/Blaze_Away!>
- Bunch O' Blackberries (1899)
- Calanthe (1900)
- Cowperthwait Centennial March (1907)
- Flying Arrow (1906)
- The Hand That Rocks The Cradle Rules The World (1901)
- Hunky Dory (1900)
- Love-Land (1905)
- Old Faithful (1908)
- The Rialto (1916)
- Smokey Mokes (1899)
- Spirit of Independence (1912)
- Symphia (1902)
- Uncle Sammy (1904)
- The Whip (1908)
- The Winning Fight (1911)
- Yankee Grit (1905)

== See also ==
- List of ragtime composers
