= Blaze Away! =

March composed by Abe Holzmann

Sheet music published in London.

"Blaze Away!" is a 1901 march by the German-American composer Abe Holzmann. It was his greatest success.

Holzmann was inspired by the Battle of Manila Bay during the Spanish–American War, when a command to American sailors to open fire on the Spanish fleet was reputedly met with the response "Well boys, let's blaze away" by the gunners. Building on the war fever in the United States, the cover of the sheet music featured an image resembling Theodore Roosevelt charging at San Juan Hill. Very popular as a two-step, its success outlasted the war and it became a repertoire piece amongst military bands around the world.

== Bibliography ==
- Shearer, Benjamin F. Home Front Heroes: A Biographical Dictionary of Americans During Wartime, Volume 2. Greenwood Publishing Group, 2007.
- Walsh, Thomas P. Tin Pan Alley and the Philippines: American Songs of War And Love, 1898-1946, A Resource Guide. Scarecrow Press, 2013.
