= Whoop Dee Doo (variety show) =

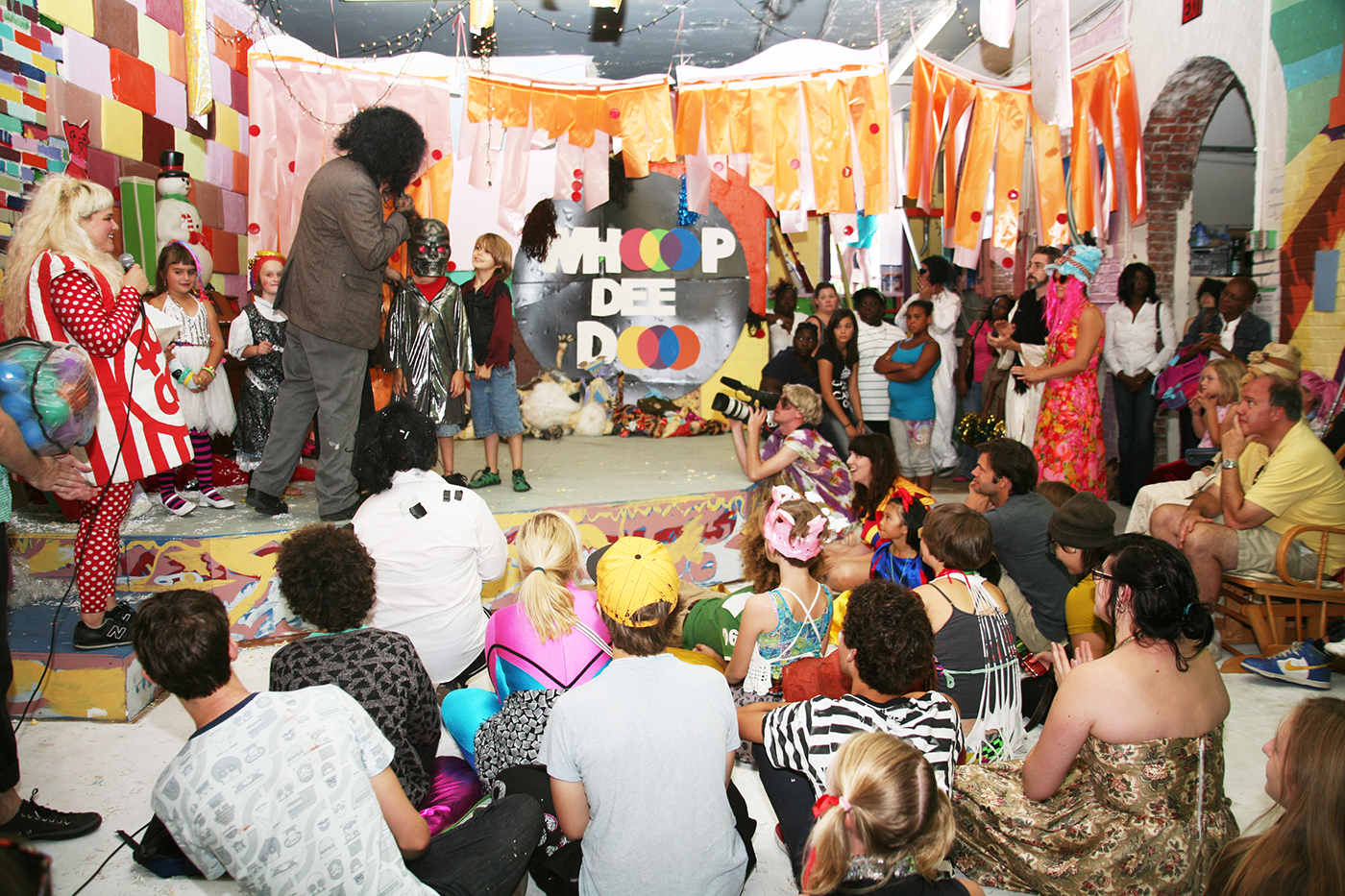
- Location: Brooklyn, New York
- Event: Children's theater

Construction
- Opened: 2006

Website
- whoopdeedoo.org

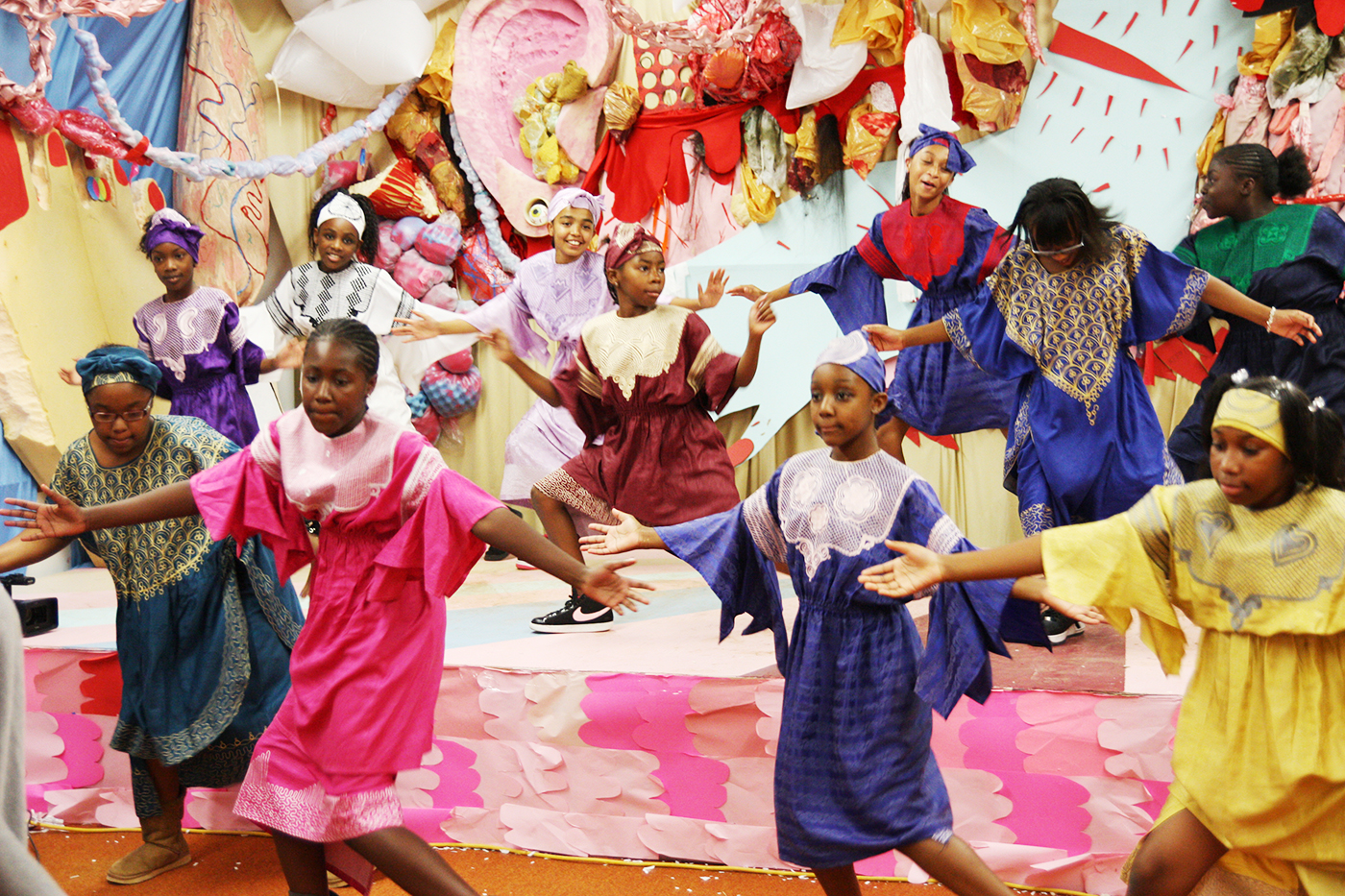

Whoop Dee Doo is a kid-friendly variety show featuring live performances and active audience participation. The show originated in Kansas City, Missouri and is known for its collaborations with local artists, performance groups, and youth organizations. Whoop Dee Doo also travels and has worked with arts organizations such as the Bemis Center for Contemporary Arts in Omaha, Nebraska, Deitch Projects in New York, NY, Loyal Gallery in Malmo, Sweden, the Kemper Museum of Contemporary Art In Kansas City, MO, The Smart Museum of Art at the University of Chicago, Pennsylvania Academy of Fine Art in Philadelphia, Pennsylvania, San Francisco Museum of Modern Art (SFMOMA) in San Francisco, and High Line in New York, NY.

Whoop Dee Doo began in 2006 and has taken various forms until the organization began to travel and gained non-profit status as a 501(c)(3) community arts organization.

Whoop Dee Doo produces and hosts free, live shows. The sets for each show are designed and fabricated throughout workshops with contemporary artists and youth groups such as Operation Breakthrough and the Boys and Girls Club, and local performance groups, most often folkloric groups.

Whoop Dee Doo has received a Franklin Furnace Grant, an Abrons Arts Center Fellowship, and was an artist-in-residence at the High Line, NYC, and Artists Alliance, NYC.

Whoop Dee Doo has created educational programming with MoMA, Art21, Museum of Arts & Design, Fondation Phi pour l’art contemporain, Contemporary Museum Baltimore and Abrons Art Center among many others. Whoop Dee Doo is a featured artist project in ART:21's documentary series New York Close Up and had a feature in Art in America written by Lorelie Ramirez discussing Whoop Dee Doo's community engagement "Recognizing your privilege, let alone using it to support other communities, is rare, especially in the art world. To do that honestly and put everything you have toward creating a memorable time for kids takes love, patience, and the awareness that creative pursuits are not equally available to everyone. Whoop Dee Doo does this work without including people for the sake of diversity but rather building environments where creativity and connection can prosper."

== Recognition ==
- US Pres Teaching Award

== See also ==
- Whoop-Dee-Doo
- Whoop-Dee-Doo!
