= Walther Aeschbacher =

Swiss conductor and composer (1901–1969)

Walther Gottlieb Aeschbacher (2 October 1901 – 6 December 1969) was a Swiss conductor and composer of classical music.
