= Whoop-Dee-Doo =

Whoop-Dee-Doo is a Broadway musical by Weber and Fields that played in 1903–1904 at Weber and Fields' Broadway Music Hall. The music book by Edgar Smith is based on Henri Lavedan's 1897 play Catherine. The musical is set at Kaiser Wilhelm Bier-haus in the city of Paris.
