= Weber and Fields' Broadway Music Hall =

Former theatre in Manhattan, New York

Coordinates: 40°44′47″N 73°59′20.5″W

Weber and Fields' Broadway Music Hall, sometimes simplified to Weber and Fields' Music Hall, was a Broadway theatre located in Manhattan on 29th Street near the corner of 29th and Broadway going towards Sixth Avenue. It was the resident theatre of comedy duo Joe Weber and Lew Fields from 1896 through 1904; with the pair starring in numerous original high energy musical farces mounted at that theatre.

== History ==
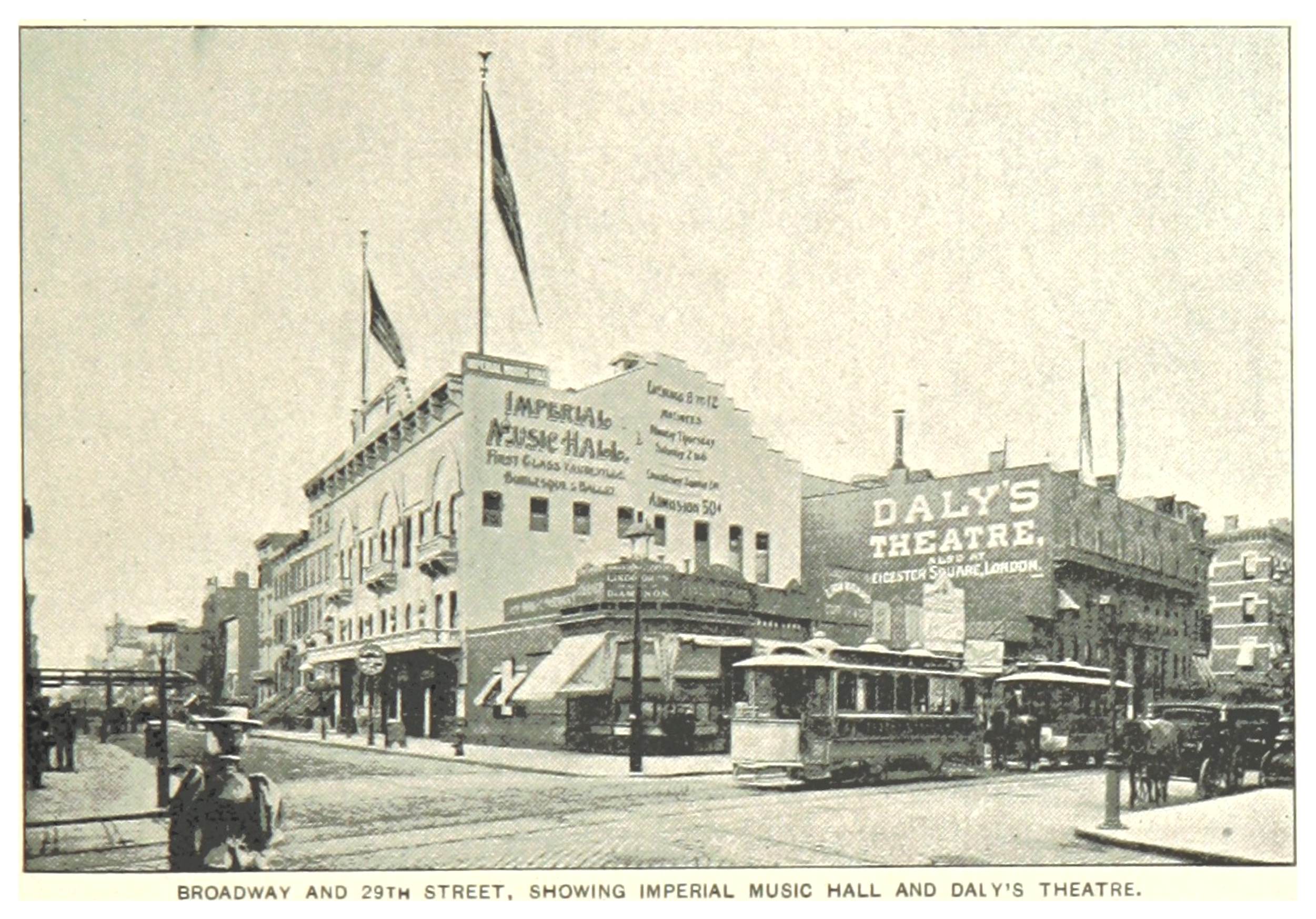
1893 photograph of the Imperial Music Hall (left) as seen from the intersection of 29th Street and Broadway

Originally named the Imperial Music Hall, the theatre was designed by architect M. V. B. Ferdon. It was built by impresario George J. Kraus in 1892, and was modeled after the Empire Theatre in London's West End. The theatre opened as a variety theatre on October 24, 1892. Kraus managed the theatre until May 27, 1896, when the building was leased to Weber and Fields. At this point the theatre was closed for renovations, and it was renamed Weber and Fields' Broadway Music Hall when it re-opened on September 5, 1896.

After nearly eight years of performance together at the Weber and Fields' Broadway Music Hall, Weber and Fields broke up their partnership in 1904 and Fields left the Broadway Music Hall while Weber remained. Fields' last performances at the theatre was in the musical Whoop-Dee-Doo which closed on January 30, 1904. After this the theatre was forced to close when the fire at Chicago's Iroquois Theater caused strict enforcement of fire laws in New York. Weber and Fields were told that they would have to remodel or close the Music Hall, leading to a disagreement which split their partnership for an extended period of time.

After Fields' departure, the theatre was renamed Weber's Music Hall beginning with Weber's first musical without Fields, Higgledy-Piggledy, which opened on October 20, 1904. Some 1904 advertisements for the Higgledy-Piggledy production also referred to the theatre as Weber and Ziegfeld's Music Hall; as Florenz Ziegfeld Jr. was the work's initial producer and his wife Anna Held was briefly a star in the production. However, this partnership was short lived as Ziegfeld and Held did not get along with Weber, and their relationship with Weber and the theatre ended rapidly after the production premiered with the actress Trixie Friganza replacing Held and Ziegfeld divesting of his role as producer and all connections with the theatre. It was later retitled Weber's Theatre.

In 1913 the theatre discontinued live performance and became a cinema. The theatre was demolished in 1917.

=== Partial list of productions ===
- Higgledy-Piggledy (1904)
- Hip! Hip! Hooray! (1907)

== Weber and Fields' Music Hall (1912-1913) ==
After an eight year separation, Weber and Fields reconciled and reunited after the death of Fields' father in 1912; attending his funeral together. A new Weber and Fields' Music Hall (later re-named the 44th Street Theatre in 1913) was built by The Shubert Organization to house the re-formed team at 216 West 44th Street in Manhattan, and it opened with a Weber and Fields burlesque production on 21 November 1912.

== Bibliography ==
- Brown, Thomas Allston (1903). A History of the New York Stage From the First Performance in 1732 to 1901, volume III. New York: Dodd, Mead & Company.
- Crosby Dimmick, Ruth (1913). "Weber's Music Hall Once The Imperial". Our Theatres To-day and Yesterday, Volume 10. H.K. Fly Company.
- Henderson, Mary C. (2004). The City and the Theatre: The History of New York Playhouses; a 250 Year Journey from Bowling Green to Times Square. Back Stage Books. ISBN 9780823006373.
- Greenfield, Thomas A. (2009). Broadway: An Encyclopedia of Theater and American Culture. ABC-CLIO. ISBN 9780313342653.
- Van Hoogstraten, Nicholas (1991). "Weber & Fields Music Hall". Lost Broadway Theatres. Princeton Architectural Press. pp. 150–154. ISBN 9780910413589.
