= Joe Weber (vaudevillian) =

American vaudeville performer (1867-1942)

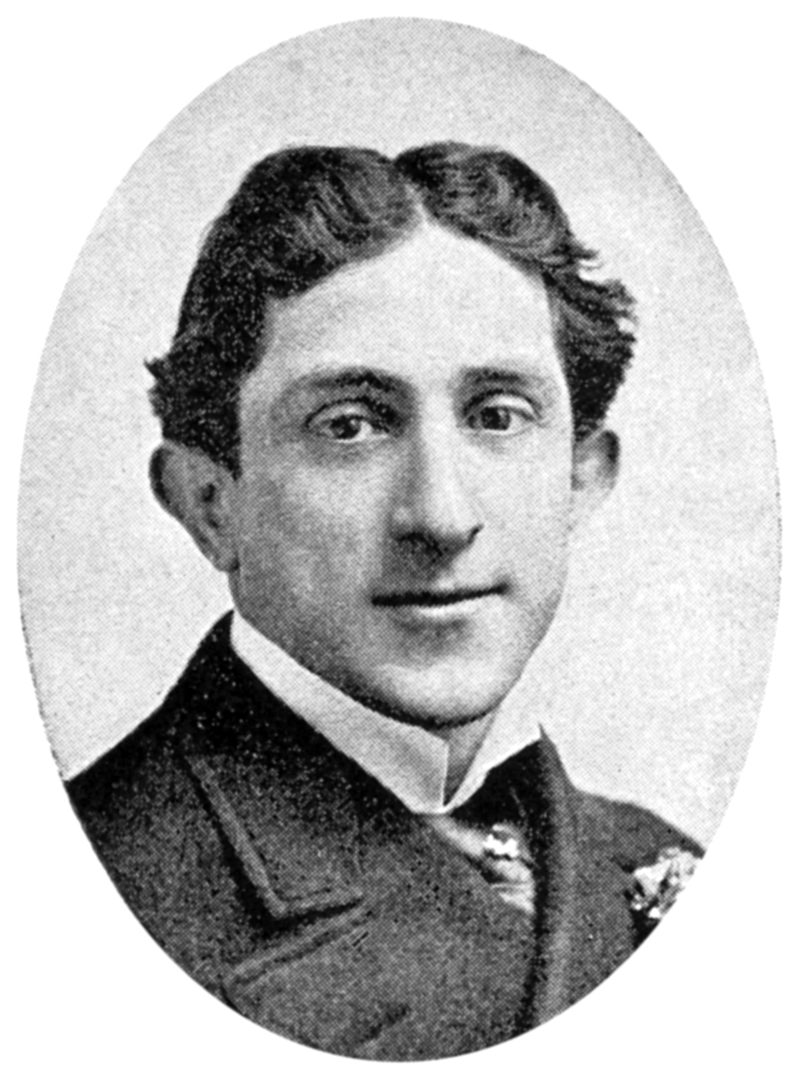
- Joe Weber in 1901
- Born: Joseph Morris Weber; August 11, 1867; New York City, United States
- Died: May 10, 1942 (aged 74); Los Angeles, United States
- Occupations: Vaudevillian, theatrical producer

Joseph Morris Weber (11 August 1867 – 10 May 1942) was an American vaudeville performer who, along with Lew Fields, formed the comedy double-act of Weber and Fields.

== Biography ==
Born to a Jewish family, Fields and Weber formed their partnership while still children. The two appeared at Bowery saloons, museums, circuses, and in 1885 made their first stage appearance at Miner's Bowery Theatre, New York when they were nine years old. Their slapstick, rough-house, English-garbling antics soon caught on and they were a sensation in San Francisco where they appeared for 10 weeks for $250 per week, an unusually high salary at that time.

The young men had a "Dutch act" in which both portrayed German immigrants. They returned to New York, appearing at Tony Pastor's theater on 14th Street, and in 1894 made their Broadway debut in Hammerstein's Olympia. They had three companies on the road.

On October 24, 1892, the Imperial Music Hall opened. Weber and Field took over the lease of the theatre on May 27, 1896, and after a period of closure for renovations, the theatre re-opened under the name Weber and Fields' Broadway Music Hall. It was the resident theatre of the comedy duo from 1896 through 1904; with the pair starring in numerous original high energy musical farces mounted at that theatre; including Cyranose de Bric-a-Brac (1898), Helter Skelter (1899), Whirl-i-gig (1899), Fiddle-dee-dee (1900), Hoity Toity (1901), Twirly Whirly (1902), Humming Birds and Onions (1902), The Stickiness of Gelatine (1902-1903), and The Big Little Princess (1903). Several of their shows were created by the writing team of Edgar Smith and Louis De Lange; the latter of which also worked as the duos manager for their national tours. These highly popular and financially profitable musical burlesques not only starred Weber and Fields, but were produced by them as well.

The Weber and Fields musical burlesques included exceptional casts with well known performers and comics of the American stage brought in to perform alongside Weber and Fields. Some performers who appeared in their productions included Lillian Russell, Fay Templeton, Ross and Fenton and DeWolf Hopper, David Warfield, Peter F. Dailey, Mabel Fenton, Marie Dressler, Willie Collier and Sam Bernard. They were forced to close the Broadway Music Hall when the fire at the Iroquois Theater, Chicago, caused strict enforcement of the fire laws in New York. The partners were told that they would have to remodel or close the Music Hall and this caused a disagreement which temporarily split their partnership. Their final performance at the theatre as a duo was in the musical Whoop-Dee-Doo on January 30, 1904; after which their partnership dissolved until they re-united eight years later.

After Fields departure, Weber rechristened the theatre Weber's Music Hall; beginning with Weber's first musical without Fields, Higgledy-Piggledy, which opened on October 20, 1904. Some early advertisements for this show also used the name Weber & Ziegfeld’s Music Hall, as Florenz Ziegfeld Jr. was the work's initial producer and his wife Anna Held was briefly a star in the production. However, this partnership was short lived as Ziegfeld and Held did not get along with Weber, and their relationship with Weber and the theatre ended quickly after the production premiered with the actress Trixie Friganza replacing Held and Ziegfeld divesting of his role as producer. The theatre was later re-named Weber’s Theatre and in 1913 became a movie theatre; ceasing live performance. The building was demolished in 1917.

Weber and Fields reunited in 1912, producing the unsuccessful Hokey Pokey and opening a new theatre Weber and Fields' Music Hall (1912–1913; later re-named the 44th Street Theatre).

Baseball game
A 1916 comedy routine with Fields

In 1923, Weber and Fields partnered yet again for a Lee DeForest Phonofilm sound-on-film short, where the team recreated their famous pool hall routine. This film premiered at the Rivoli Theater in New York City on April 15, 1923. Three years later, the duo were among those supporting Will Rogers and Mary Garden on the NBC Radio Network's November 15, 1926 debut broadcast. Their own NBC series followed in 1931.

Weber and Fields also reunited for the December 27, 1932 inaugural show at Radio City Music Hall, which proved to be the last stage appearance of the two performers as a team. They gave a cameo performance performing their "casino" routine in the 1940 movie Lillian Russell.

== Legacy ==
The backstage hostility in Neil Simon's play and film The Sunshine Boys is reportedly based on Gallagher and Shean, but also possibly on Weber and Fields, or on Smith and Dale, other similar comedy teams with partners in real-life conflict.
