= Lotta Faust =

American actress, dancer, and vaudeville performer

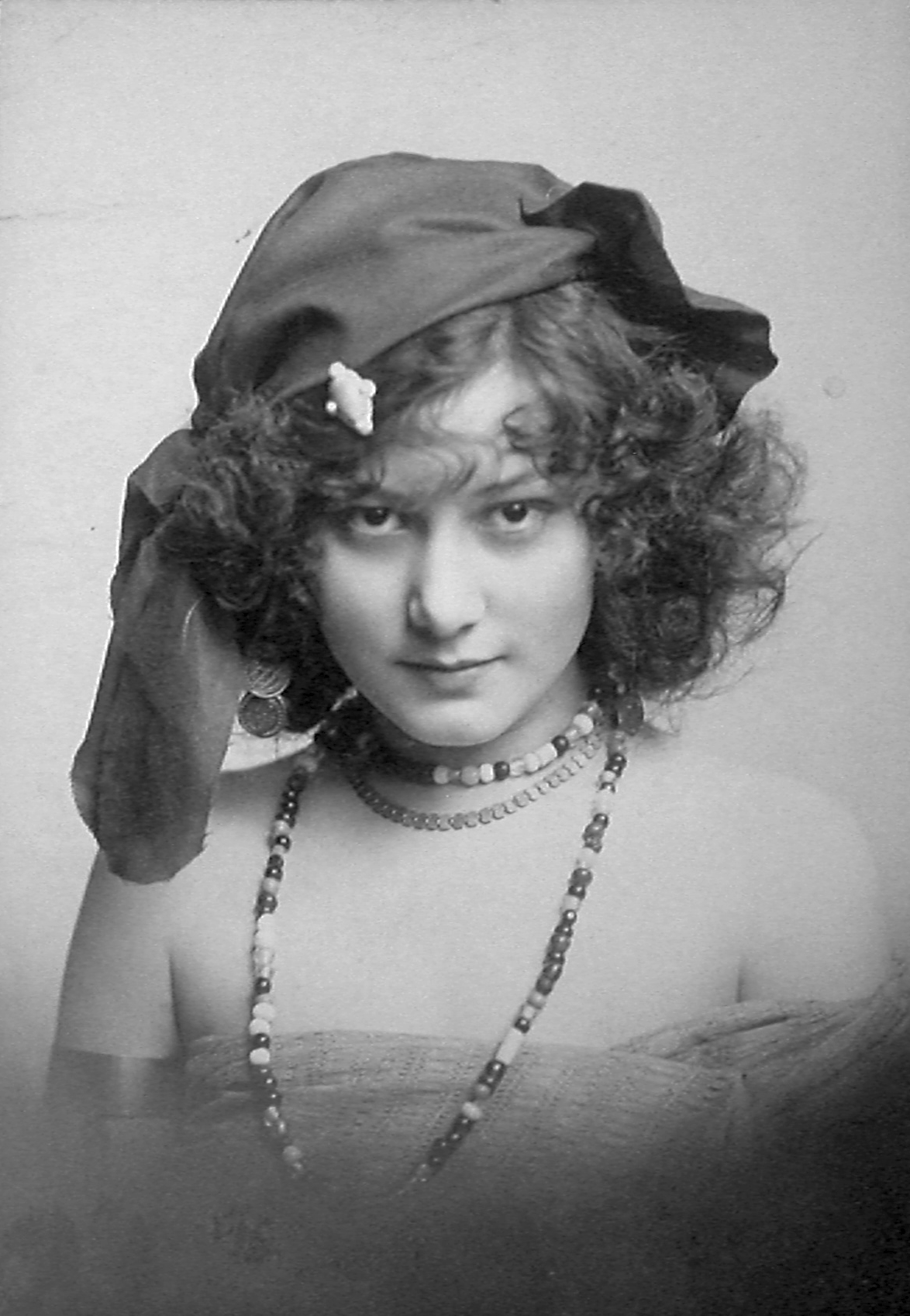
- Faust about 1908
- Born: Charlotte Faust; February 8, 1880; Brooklyn, New York, U.S.
- Died: January 26, 1910 (aged 29); New York City, New York, U.S.
- Occupations: Actress; dancer; singer
- Years active: 1896–1910
- Spouses: Paul Schindler (m. 1898; div. 1902) Richard Ling (m. 1902; div. 1909)
- Partner: Malcolm A. Strauss

Charlotte "Lotta" Faust (February 8, 1880 – January 25, 1910) was an American actress, dancer, and singer.

== Early life ==
Charlotte Faust was born on February 8, 1880, in Brooklyn, New York the daughter of Mary Hauff Faust and Frank Faust.

== Actress ==
Faust's first appearance in theater came in The Sunshine of Paradise Alley (1896), written by Denman Thompson and George W. Ryer. In 1900 she appeared in The Belle of Bohemia while in September 1901 she acted the role of Geraldine Fair in The Liberty Belles at the Madison Square Theatre. She became popular in The Wizard of Oz (1904–1905), in which she sang the Sammy song. She then joined the company of Joe Weber and appeared in Wonderland (1905). Later she was among the cast of The White Hen (1907), starring Louis Mann at the Casino Theatre. In 1907 she was in the troupe of Lew Fields in The Girl Behind The Counter (1907–1908), The Mimic World in 1908 and The Midnight Sons in 1909.

== Vaudeville ==
Faust's vaudeville career began at the Casino Theatre with the introduction of a unique cake walk. She teamed with Frank Bernard for this act in April 1900. In August 1908, she appeared at the same venue performing a Salome interpretive dance, which received widespread positive and negative attention. She claimed to experience both the horror and fascination during her performances.

Faust was among the most notable performers, along with Ada Overton Walker, Eva Tanguay, Vera Olcott, La Sylphe, Gertrude H. Hoffman, Ruth St. Denis, Mademoiselle Dazie, Julian Eltinge, and Fanny Brice, of a Salome dance during the "Salomania" craze in America.

== Personal life ==
Faust was married twice. Her first husband was Paul Schindler, a musical director, whom she divorced in 1902. In the 1900 census, the couple are listed as living with the Green family as boarders. Her second husband was singer and comedian Richard Ling, whom she wed shortly after divorcing her first husband.

== Death ==
Faust died in January 1910 at a sanitarium on 33 East 33rd Street in New York City. The cause of death was pneumonia which resulted from an operation she had several weeks earlier. Just before she became ill, she played a primary role in The Midnight Sons. She sued Ling for divorce a short while before her death. Faust was engaged to Malcolm A. Strauss, an illustrator, at the time of her death.

== See also ==
- Mabel Barrison
