= Vera Olcott =

American dancer

Countess Vera Ivanova (née Olcott; 1893–19??) was an American dancer from Philadelphia who became popular in Europe in the early 20th century.

== Dance innovator ==
Olcott was one of many women who performed Salome dances in vaudeville venues in New York City. Among them were La Sylphe, Eva Tanguay, Lotta Faust and Gertrude Hoffman.

Olcott ran away from home at the age of sixteen and found work as a Broadway chorus girl. In 1908 she wore an abbreviated tarletan skirt in her rendition of the Salome dance at Huber's 14th Street (Manhattan) Museum. Regarding her inspiration, she admitted to taking notice of any newspaper or magazine with a picture of Salome. However she professed to have neither read the Bible or been aware of the story of Salome and Herod Antipas. She was apprehensive that the police would soon prohibit her competitors' presentations of the Salome dance. Olcott was frank in saying "some of 'em ain't refined". She feared this would lead to the cancellation of all performances of the dance.

She possessed exquisitely formed, tiny feet, which earned for her the "silver slippers", presented to the woman with the "smallest and most beautiful feet in Paris". Following her selection, Olcott signed a contract which catapulted her from a chorus girl to one of the most well paid stars of the French stage. She also received as gifts more than one hundred pairs of shoes, especially made for her tiny feet. Olcott claimed a $100,000 prize in 1922 for having the most beautiful legs in Paris. She quickly had them insured for $100,000. In March 1923 she appeared at the Palace Theatre, London with Harry Pilcer in Toutes les Femmes (All The Ladies). Her attire for this show included a feathered headdress with curling plumes. In August 1923 she was aboard the President Harding, passenger ship of the United States Lines, when it docked in Hoboken, New Jersey. Olcott was a passenger on the RMS Berengaria which departed New York City destined for Cherbourg, France and Southampton, England, in December 1923.

She introduced the Charleston to Berlin at the Theatre des Westens, in August 1926. In 1927 she traveled from Paris to the French Riviera, performing her interpretation of the black bottom (dance).

== Marriage to Russian noble ==
Olcott became the first wife of Count Alexis Constantinovitch Zarnekau, a Russian nobleman and cousin of Czar Nicholas II, whom she secretly wedded. Vera Ivanova, as she was known when married, eventually tired of her husband's lavish attention and the luxuries he bestowed on her. She made her way back to United States and was soon divorced by Zarnekau. The Count made provisions for his final Slavic estates to be given to Olcott. When he died in front of the Winter Palace, his land was taken by Bolsheviks.

Another newspaper article reported Olcott in Berlin searching for Zarnekau in September 1926. This story described her acting upon a clue that he did not die in battle, an event which was never verified. Olcott supposedly received a "mysterious letter" from abroad stating that Zarnekau was still alive. According to this news item Olcott returned to the United States at Zarnekau's instruction during World War I. She ventured to Europe in 1926 with a desire to reunite with him, so that they could resume their position in "Czarist circles". At the time there was still hope of a royal restoration in Russia.
