= Charles A. Bigelow =

American actor

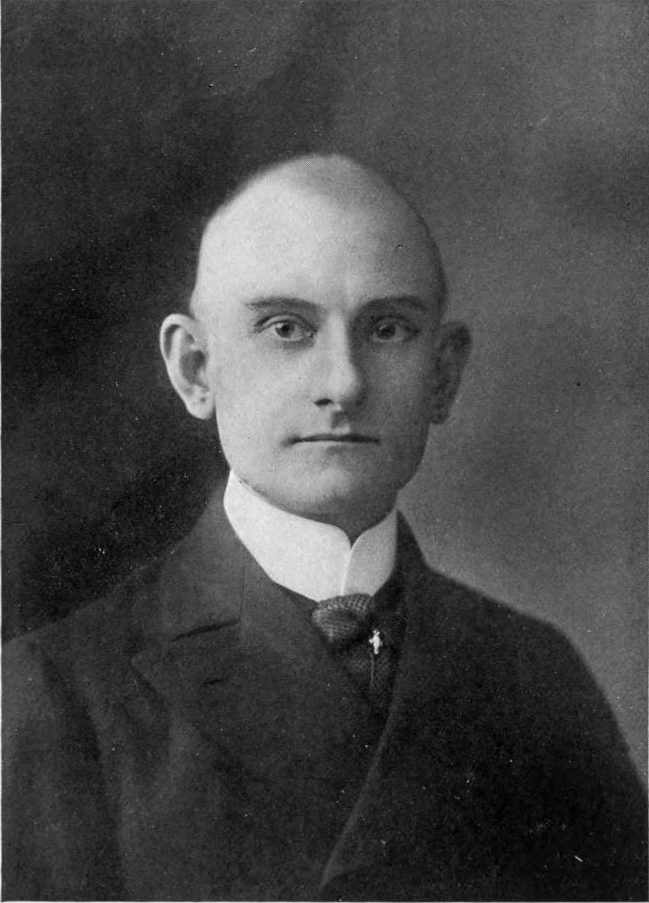
Charles A. Bigelow

Charles Allen Bigelow (December 12, 1862 – March 12, 1912) was an American actor. He had an active career as a comedian in musicals and light operas during the late 19th century and early 20th century. A native of Cleveland, Ohio, he began his career in Boston at the age of 14. From 1894 until 1911 he appeared regularly on Broadway.

== Life and career ==
The son of Henry A. and Matilda Bigelow, Charles Allen Bigelow was born in Cleveland, Ohio on December 12, 1862. He made his stage debut at the age of fourteen performing in The Crystal Slipper in Boston. He became a leading comedian with the Carleton Opera Company before coming to New York for the first time with Lillian Russell's theatre troupe in The Princess Nicotine; a work which was staged at the Lyric Theatre in 1894.

Bigelow was frequently seen on the New York stage in musical comedies. In the 1894-1895 season he starred in Little Christopher, and immediately following this appeared in Excelsior, Jr. in the 1895-1896 season. In 1896 he portrayed Mr. Ebenezer Honeycomb in The Girl from Paris at the Herald Square Theatre. He performed alongside Anna Held in Florenz Ziegfeld, Jr.'s revival of The French Maid in 1899 and received rave reviews. In 1901-1902 he starred as Gustave in Reginald De Koven's The Little Duchess at the Casino Theatre. He subsequently returned to that theater in An English Daisy (1904, as Daniel Crab).

In 1904 Bigelow starred as Peter Pudge in Paul West and John W. Bratton's The Man from China at the Majestic Theatre, and Sandy Walker in Edgar Smith's Higgledy-Piggledy at Weber and Fields' Broadway Music Hall. He subsequently returned to Weber and Fields as Ratty McGown in The College Widower (1905), Ebenezer Dodge in Twiddle-Twaddle (1906), and Theobald in Alma, Where Do You Live? (1910). In 1906-1907 he performed the role of Silas Goldfinch in Max Hoffman, Sr.'s A Parisian Model at the Broadway Theatre; returning to that theater in 1908 as Joachim XIII in A Waltz Dream. He appeared at the New York Theatre in 1908 as Ezra Pettingill and Pompignac in Ludwig Englander's musical Miss Innocence.

In his later career, Bigelow became unreliable and, after suffering a nervous breakdown, he was institutionalized in New York by his wife in December 1910. His final Broadway performance was in Carl Michael Ziehrer's The Kiss Waltz (1911) at the Casino Theatre. While performing in this show he became ill, and was taken to a sanatorium in Cambridge Springs, Pennsylvania for treatment. He died at Spencer Hospital in Meadville, Pennsylvania on March 12, 1912.
