= A Parisian Model =

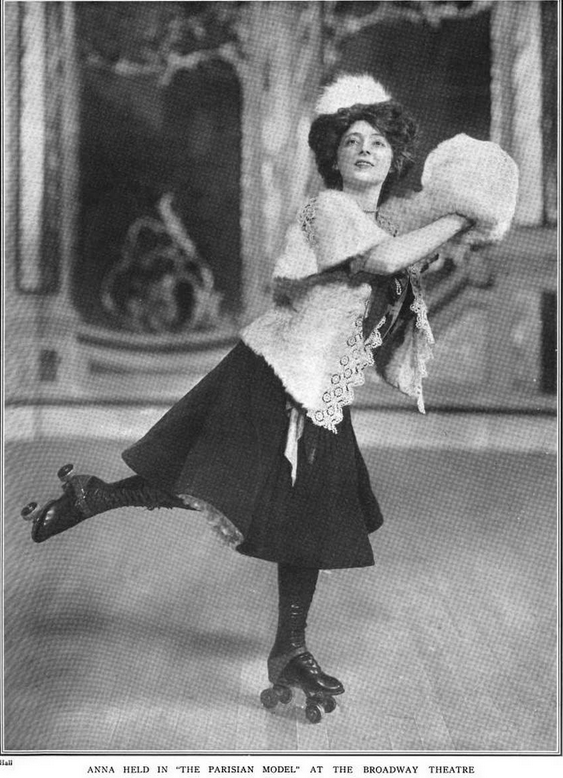
- Anna Held in A Parisian Model
- Music: Max Hoffman, Sr.
- Lyrics: Harry B. Smith
- Book: Harry B. Smith
- Productions: 1906 Broadway; 1908 Broadway

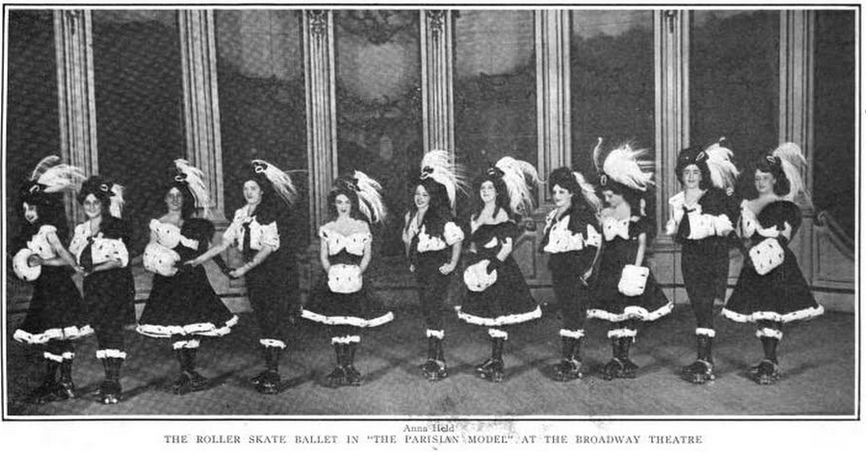
The "Roller Skate Ballet" in A Parisian Model

A Parisian Model is a 1906 Edwardian musical comedy with music by Max Hoffman, Sr. to a book and lyrics by Harry B. Smith. The story concerns a dressmaker's model who comes into a fortune. It opened on Broadway in 1906, ran with success and toured. It was produced by Frank McKee and Florenz Ziegfeld Jr., and starred Anna Held, Ziegfeld's common law wife. Soon after the success of this piece, Ziegfeld would launch his famous series of Ziegfeld Follies revues.

== Background ==
After sold out pre-Broadway tryouts in cities like Baltimore and Cleveland, the show ran for 179 performances at the Broadway Theatre on 41st Street in New York City from November 27, 1906 to June 29, 1907 and then went on tour in the US. It returned to Broadway for three more weeks in 1908. The musical was directed and choreographed by Julian Mitchell. Ernest Albert designed the production's sets. Beside Held, it starred Henry Leoni, Truly Shattuck and Charles A. Bigelow; Gertrude Hoffman, the composer's wife, led the chorus dancers. Held's many onstage costume changes, especially in the song "A Gown for Each Hour of the Day", together with her dance with a cross-dressing Gertrude Hoffman and other slinky dancing by Held, Hoffman and the chorus, made the show provocative or "salacious".

Held's success in Ziegfeld's shows, especially A Parisian Model, cemented his popularity and led to his series of lavish revues, beginning in 1907, the Ziegfeld Follies. Held suggested the format for the Follies. The interpolated song I Just Can't Make My Eyes Behave, with lyrics by Will D. Cobb and music by Gus Edwards, became one of Held's greatest hits. In addition to Hoffman's score, several numbers were written by Vincent Bryan, Will D. Cobb, Gus Edwards, Paul Rubens and others.

== Plot ==
Anna, a Parisian dressmaker's model, inherits a fortune under the will of an elderly lady, so long as she does not reveal the source of the windfall. Her artist boyfriend, Henri, concludes that she has received the money from another man and is furiously jealous. In retaliation, he begins a public affair with an actress, Violette. Eventually, Anna persuades him that he loves her more. Meanwhile, Silas Goldfinch, an American with an oppressive wife, arrives in various comic disguises in an attempt to give away his own fortune; he has a crush on Anna.

== Roles and original cast ==
- Anna (the Parisian model) – Anna Held
- Julien de Marsay (her lover) – Henry Leoni
- Violette (of the Opera Comique; his lover) – Truly Shattuck
- Silas Goldfinch (who is trying to spend his money) – Charles A. Bigelow
- Mrs. Silas Goldfinch – Mabella Baker
- Hercule (strong man of the Paris Olympia) – F. Stanton Heck
- Fifine (a ballet girl) – Ethel Gilmore
- Titine (a ballet girl) – Madlyn Summers (billed as "Madelaine Summers")
- Carver Stone (an American sculptor) – James H. Bradbury
- Callot (a dictator of fashions) – Edouard Durand
- Celeste (a shop girl at Callot's) – Adele Carson
- Colombe – Gertrude Hoffman

== Musical numbers ==
Act 1

- Trying on Dresses – Chorus
- The Only Man I Ever Loved – Violette and Chorus
- I'm the Man (They Talk About So Much) – Silas Goldfinch and Ensemble
- A Gown for Each Hour of the Day – Anna and Chorus
- The American Girl in Paris – Julien de Marsay and Grand Prix Girls
- A Lesson in Kissing (Kiss Kiss Kiss) (If You Want to Learn to Kiss) – Anna and Silas Goldfinch

Act 2

- Paris Carnival – Chorus
- Lots of Good Fish in the Sea – Julien de Marsay and Chorus
- I (Just) Can't Make My Eyes Behave (music and lyrics by Will D. Cobb, Gus Edwards and Harry B. Smith) – Anna
- Artists and Models – Ensemble
- (I Love You) Ma Cherie (My Sweetheart) (music and lyrics by Paul Rubens) – Julien de Marsay
- In Washington (music and lyrics by Vincent Bryan, Max Hoffman, Sr. and Harry B. Smith) – Silas Goldfinch
- (On) San Francisco Bay (music by Gertrude Hoffman; lyrics by Vincent Bryan) – Violette and Company

Act 3

- Bells (The Bell Song) – Chorus
- When We're Married – Anna and Julien de Marsay

== Reception ==
The New York Times gave the musical a positive review, calling it "a pungent show, with a great amount of feminine spice attractively attired. ... [S]everal clever "numbers" and two or three songs ... doubtless will become contagious." It felt that the "very small plot" was "delicately attenuated" and praised many of the performances, concluding that it was "an extravagant and entertaining production of its species, not without good lyrics and pleasing music". The New York Dramatic Mirror, however, sharply criticized the musical. It acknowledged that "Anna Held's eyes, Julian Mitchell's stage-management, Charles Bigelow's personality, the good looks of the chorus, and salaciousness of several of the features will probably allow The Parisian Model to edify the Broadway crowds for many weeks to come". The paper praised many of the performances and the climactic skating scene but concluded: "Real merit the concoction has none, the music being reminiscent, the humor bewhiskered and hoary, and the plot imperceptible. 'La Mattchiche', the dance performed by Miss Held and Miss Hoffman ... is quite the most disgusting exhibition seen on Broadway this season."
