= Gertrude Hoffmann =

Gertrude Hoffmann is the name of:

- Gertrude Hoffmann (dancer) (1885–1966), American dancer and choreographer
- Gertrude Hoffmann (actress) (1871–1968), German-born American actress
