= Pat Walshe =

American actor (1900-1991)

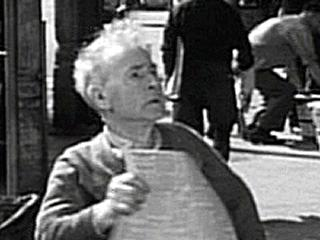
- Walshe in Panic in the Streets (1950)
- Born: Patrick Walshe; July 26, 1900; New York City, U.S.
- Died: December 11, 1991 (aged 91); Los Angeles, California, U.S.
- Resting place: Westwood Village Memorial Park Cemetery
- Occupations: Actor; circus performer; vaudevillian
- Years active: 1908–1950
- Height: 3 ft 11 in (119 cm)

Patrick Walshe (July 26, 1900 – December 11, 1991) was an American dwarf character actor and circus performer who specialized in impersonating and portraying animals. He is best known for playing Nikko, the head of the Winged Monkeys in the MGM film The Wizard of Oz (1939). He appeared in only a few films, as most of his work was in theater, vaudeville and circus. Throughout his vaudeville career, he was a frequent collaborator of Lew Fields and Joe Cook.

== Life and career ==
A triptych of Walshe, from The Boston Post, 1920. From left to right: Walshe outside his monkey costume, getting into his costume, and in full costume with makeup.

Pat Walshe was born as Patrick Walshe, on July 26, 1900, in New York City. Living his early years in Brooklyn, Walshe had a form of restricted growth, and as a result never grew to be taller than 3'11".

Walshe began performing in vaudeville shows and circuses at a young age. He made his first Broadway appearance in 1908 in Lew Fields's production of The Girl Behind the Counter, where he played "Thompkins", part of a quartet of comical waiters. In 1909, he went on to perform in The Midnight Sons alongside little actor Irwin Emmer. Emmer and Walshe appeared as a pair of birds, making this one of Walshe's earliest appearances as an animal. Shortly after, he appeared in the Ringling Brothers Circus, run by the famed Ringling Brothers. He also appeared alongside 'The Rising Generation', a vaudeville family act, featuring a young Eddie Quillan.

In following years, Walshe appeared in the cabaret revue Hell at the Folies-Bergère, and later was reunited with Lew Fields for Bunty, Bulls and Strings, where he played "Mr MacGregor", a Scottish farmer. He performed as a clown with the Barnum & Bailey Circus at Madison Square Garden in 1912. In 1913, Walshe heard that the American Play Company was producing Within the Law, with an entire cast of dwarf actors, and he wrote to them hoping for a part. The same year, he appeared in the Broadway production A Good Little Devil, starring Mary Pickford, where he played the roles of a gnome called "Huggermunk", and of a squirrel. Subsequently, Walshe appeared in Winthrop Ames' production of Snow White and the Seven Dwarfs, once again with Irwin Emmer. He subsequently spent time with the Frank A. Robbins Circus and the following year he appeared, alongside Irwin Emmer and several other dwarf actors, at the 'Toyland' exhibit of the Panama–Pacific International Exposition.

Walshe made his motion picture debut in 1915, in the Lew Fields comedy Old Dutch. He reprised his role from The Girl Behind the Counter from five years previously. The waiters' quartet had been popular with audiences, so Fields reunited them all for his comedy film produced by World Films.

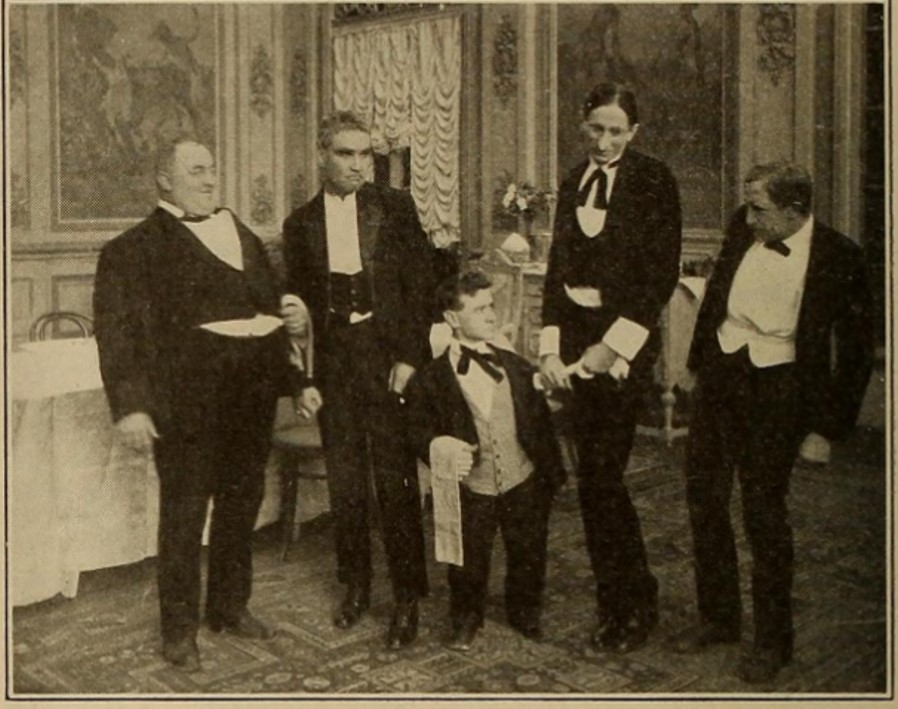
Walshe (center) in his motion picture debut Old Dutch, as part of the "waiters' quartet" alongside Lew Fields (far right)

Many of Walshe's performances included playing animals, particularly monkeys and apes. Eventually he began to specialize in monkeys. This gained him popularity on the vaudeville circuit, where he appeared in shows such as Lew Fields' and Joe Weber's Reunion show. Appearing in many variety shows, Walshe earned prominence for his performances and received the nickname 'the Monkey Man'. His performances were known for their meticulous attention to detail. He made many visits to zoos to study primate behaviour, and could faithfully mimic their physicality and sounds. A zookeeper he befriended allowed him to enter the apes' cages to spend time closer to them. His performance was so realistic that, when wearing his costume, he was allegedly able to convince a particular chimp that he was an ape, scaring it.

Rather than attaching fur to his body, Walshe had a costumer make a special fur suit for him. However, Walshe dealt with the makeup himself. With grey paint, he used highlights and shadows, as well as protruding false teeth and a wig to transform himself into a monkey. Walshe often worked directly with apes, which was dangerous due to the creatures' unpredictable nature. To minimize risk, Walshe was well acquainted with the apes with which he appeared, had an in-depth knowledge of ape psychology, and was naturally comfortable around them.

In addition to working with live apes simply to mimic their movements, Walshe also performed with them. One of his best-known performances was alongside the trained chimp Baldy, of whom Walshe was custodian for several years. They performed in many shows, and did stunts, such as riding a two-seated bicycle together. Working with Baldy's trainer, the two spent weeks inside Baldy's cage, to help prepare her for the performance, as well as simply studying her behavior. Walshe had a close bond with Baldy, and was known to carry a photo of her in his pocket. He described her as "the most intelligent of all performers of the animal kingdom".

Throughout the 1920s, Walshe earned a reputation for his act. At one point he worked as a businessman, though he found being a little person made it considerably difficult. His business was unsuccessful, and after a period of illness, he ceased his business activities and returned to performing. In 1920 he was once again reunited with Irwin Emmer, when they both played monkeys in As You Were.

In 1928, Walshe was enlisted to appear in Rain or Shine, at George M. Cohan's Theatre, starring Joe Cook. In the Broadway musical, which centered on a circus, he appeared alongside fellow circus performers Fred Gregory (a noted acrobat for Barnum and Bailey) and Dave Chasen (later famous for his Chasen's restaurant). Unlike most of the principal cast, all three had extensive circus and carnival experience, and performed an act with various acrobatics and stunts. Walshe portrayed the role of marmoset, and one point was propelled from the end of a pole. Despite their prominence in the show, neither Gregory nor Walshe were credited in its program, but did receive billing on posters and were mentioned in press releases. After opening on Broadway, the production toured the North America throughout 1929.

Walshe continued to perform in vaudeville, variety shows, circuses, and several Broadway productions, as well as the occasional screen appearance. In 1930 he appeared in Harold Beaudine short film Seeing Things starring William Demarest. Back on stage he appeared in Fine and Dandy with Joe Cook, with whom he'd worked in 1928 in Rain or Shine. Walshe appeared alongside another dwarf actor, Hermon Ergotti, a German standing 3'8". They portrayed "The Colt", with Walshe doubling as "J. Newton Wheer". In 1936 Walshe appeared in Topsy Turvy Revue, billed as the 'midget Tarzan', again with Joe Cook.

== The Wizard of Oz ==
Walshe as Nikko in The Wizard of Oz

In 1938, Walshe was cast in the most prominent role of his career: his feature film appearance in The Wizard of Oz, where he played Nikko, the leader of the Winged Monkeys. Walshe was sought after for the role due to his extensive vaudeville and circus experience and his acclaimed ape imitations. His casting was formally announced on September 28 and he travelled up to MGM on October 3.

Unlike the other monkeys, Nikko was a credited role, serving as the Wicked Witch's (played by Margaret Hamilton) minion and second-in-command. Though he had no spoken lines, performing only through physical movement, he received on-screen credit (rare for bit players at the time). Instead of the simple stage makeup he generally used in his shows, he had to wear complex prosthetics designed by Jack Dawn. While the other monkeys wore simple rubber masks, Walshe needed to appear in closeups, so multi-piece prosthetic makeup was produced for him, moulded to his features and glued to his face. He also wore a full fur body suit, with a short open tunic as well as a tail and wings. Unlike the other monkeys, Nikko's wings are clipped to prevent him from flying. As a result, he is confined mostly to the Witch's castle and does not take part in the forest capture of Dorothy.

Although Walshe is listed in the film's credits as "Nikko", and despite his frequent appearances, the name "Nikko" is never spoken. (In the book, the character is simply called "the Monkey King".) Many of the film's viewers wondered who "Nikko" was; some confused him with the Captain of the Winkie Guards (played by Mitchell Lewis).

== Later career, retirement ==
From 1945 to 1946, Walshe performed with the Ringling Bros. and Barnum & Bailey Circus, Al Dean's Circus, at the Court Square Theater, and with the Cole Bros. Circus. He also made some other film appearances, with minor roles in Pinky and Roseanna McCoy, and in addition to working as a stunt double. He had one of his few on-screen speaking roles in Panic in the Streets (1950), where he played a newspaper peddler named Pat (after himself). Walshe eventually quit performing due to the physical demands of his work, but was still remembered for his appearance in The Wizard of Oz.

== Death ==
Walshe died on December 11, 1991, in Los Angeles, following a heart attack. At the age of 91, he was the last surviving credited cast member of The Wizard of Oz. His resting place is in Westwood Memorial Park.

== Selected theatre appearances ==
- The Girl Behind the Counter (1908) - Thompkins, a waiter
- The Midnight Sons (1909) - Bird
- Ringling Brothers Circus (1910)
- Hell at Folies-Begere (1911) - An Antique
- Bunty Bull and Strings (1912) - Mr MacGregor
- Barnum & Bailey at Madison Square Garden (1912) - Clown
- A Good Little Devil (1913) - Huggermunk/Squirrel
- Snow White and the Seven Dwarfs (1913) - Dwarf
- Frank A. Robbins Circus (1914)
- Toyland (1915)
- Weber and Fields Reunion (1915) - Monkey
- Good-Bye, Bill (1918) - Chorus
- As You Were (1920) - Primeval Father
- The Merchant of Venice (1922) - Jessica's monkey
- The Jeweled Tree (1926) - Hotep/First Shade
- Rain or Shine (1928–29) - The Monkey
- Fine and Dandy (1930–31) - J. Newton Wheer/The Colt
- Topsy Turvy Revue (1936) - Midget Tarzan
- Ringling Bros. and Barnum & Bailey Circus (1945–46)
- Al Dean's Circus (1946) - The Human Ape
- Cole Bros. Circus (1950)

== Filmography ==
Year	Title	Role	Notes
1915	Old Dutch	Waiter	Film debut, Uncredited
1930	Seeing Things	Little Guy	Short
1939	The Wizard of Oz	Nikko	
1949	Pinky	Minor Role	Uncredited
1949	Roseanna McCoy	A Hatfield	Uncredited
1950	Panic in the Streets	Pat - Newspaper Peddler	Final film, Uncredited
