= Panic in the Streets (film) =

1950 film by Elia Kazan

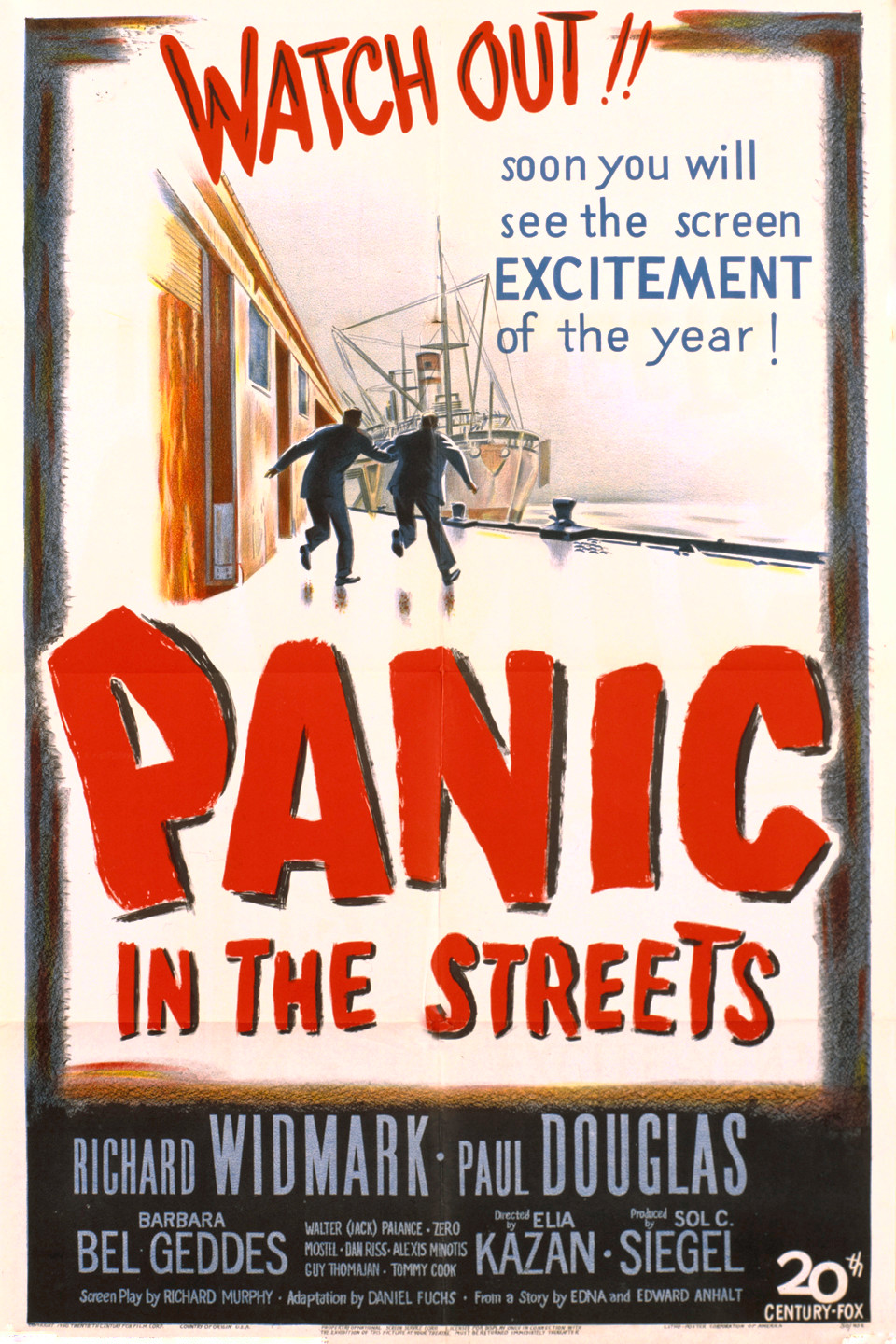
- Theatrical release publicity artwork poster
- Directed by: Elia Kazan
- Screenplay by: Richard Murphy; Daniel Fuchs
- Story by: Edna Anhalt; Edward Anhalt
- Produced by: Sol C. Siegel
- Starring: Richard Widmark; Paul Douglas; Barbara Bel Geddes; Jack Palance; Zero Mostel
- Cinematography: Joseph MacDonald
- Edited by: Harmon Jones
- Music by: Alfred Newman
- Production company: Twentieth Century-Fox
- Distributed by: Twentieth Century-Fox
- Release dates: August 4, 1950 (New York); September 15, 1950 (Los Angeles)
- Running time: 96 minutes
- Country: United States
- Language: English
- Budget: $1,400,000

Panic in the Streets is a 1950 American medical-themed film noir thriller directed by Elia Kazan and released by Twentieth Century-Fox. It was shot exclusively on location in New Orleans, Louisiana, and features numerous scenes around the city and Port of New Orleans along the Mississippi River. Many local citizens appear in both speaking and non-speaking roles. This is Jack Palance’s film debut.

The film tells the story of a city's efforts to forestall a deadly epidemic of pneumonic plague.

The score was composed by Alfred Newman.

== Plot ==
In the wharf area of New Orleans a man named Kochak, sick with a flulike illness, is killed after a brawl by gangster Blackie and his two flunkies, Kochak's cousin Poldi and a man named Fitch. They leave the body on the docks, and later when the unidentified dead man is brought to the morgue, the coroner grows suspicious about the bacteria present in his blood and calls Dr. Clinton Reed of the U.S. Public Health Service.

Reed examines the body and determines that Kochak had pneumonic plague, a pulmonary version of the bubonic plague. Reed insists that everyone who came into contact with the body be inoculated and that the victim's identity be traced to find anyone else in contact with him during the previous days. Reed meets with people from the New Orleans mayor's office, the police commissioner and other city police and public-health officials, but they are skeptical. Eventually, he convinces them that they have 48 hours to save New Orleans from the plague. Reed must also convince police detective Tom Warren, who is assigned to the case, and the others that the press must not be notified to avoid spreading mass panic.

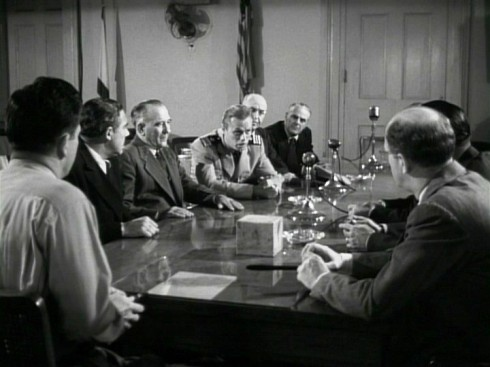
Scene depicting police and public-health experts discussing the emergency.

Warren and his men interview Slavic immigrants, as the autopsy suggested that the man may be of Eastern European descent. Reed accuses Warren of not taking the threat seriously, but Warren suspects Reed of only thinking of his career. Reed acts on a hunch that the man may have entered the city illegally when he visits the National Maritime Union and distributes photos of the dead man to the sailors. Reed enters a café next door hoping for more leads. A young woman appears and takes Reed to see her friend Charlie, who reluctantly admits that he worked aboard the Nile Queen, the ship on which the dead man was smuggled.

Fitch, who claims to know nothing, warns the crook Blackie about the investigation. Blackie plans to leave town, suspecting that the police might be after smuggled goods that sidekick Poldi had received from Kochak. Reed and Warren, now working together, visit the Nile Queen and convince the crew to talk because their lives may be at stake. The sailors reveal a sick child and allow Reed and Warren to inoculate and question them. The men reply that Kochak had boarded in North Africa and was fond of shish kebab. With this lead, Reed and Warren search the city's Greek restaurants. Blackie arrives to meet Poldi, who is now very ill. Reed learns that a woman has died with a suspicious fever and realizes that she was the wife of a Greek restaurant owner whom he had questioned.

Reed returns to headquarters to discover that a reporter is inquiring about the unusual situation and is threatening to break the story. Warren imprisons the reporter to prevent him from publishing. Late in the evening, Reed's wife announces that she is pregnant. A few hours later, Reed and Warren learn that the mayor is angry about their treatment of the reporter, who has been released and announces that the story will appear in the next day's paper, in just four hours.

Blackie goes to Poldi's room and tries to force him to reveal information about the smuggled goods, but Poldi is now delirious. Blackie calls his doctor and tells Poldi's grandmother that they will take care of him. Reed, acting on information from the nurse tending to Poldi, arrives and Blackie and Fitch, who are carrying Poldi down the outside stairs, throw him over the railing and flee. Reed chases the two men to the docks and tells them about the plague danger. The men escape through the docks, and Warren shoots and injures Blackie, saving Reed's life. Blackie accidentally shoots Fitch and is wounded. He tries to hoist himself onto a docked freighter, but he falls into the water. The men are finally captured and, with his work done, Reed heads home. On the way, Warren offers Reed some of the smuggled perfume that Poldi had received from Kochak. At his house, Reed hears the radio announcing the resolution of the crisis.

== Cast ==
- Richard Widmark as Lt. Comm. Clinton Reed, M.D.
- Paul Douglas as Captain Tom Warren
- Barbara Bel Geddes as Nancy Reed
- Jack Palance as Blackie (credited as Walter Jack Palance)
- Zero Mostel as Raymond Fitch
- Dan Riss as Neff
- Tommy Cook as Vince Poldi
- Guy Thomajan as Poldi (uncredited)
- Alexis Minotis as John Mefaris (uncredited)
- Aline Stevens as Rita Mefaris (uncredited)
- Tommy Rettig as Tommy Reed (uncredited)
- George Ehmig as Kleber (uncredited)
- Paul Hostetler as Lt. Paul Gafney, M.D.
- Emile Meyer as Capt. Beauclyde (uncredited)
- H. Waller Fowler Jr. as Mayor Murray (uncredited)
- Lewis Charles as Kochak (uncredited)
- Pat Walshe as Pat (uncredited)
- Lenka Peterson as Jeanette (uncredited)
- Wilson Bourg Jr. as Charlie (uncredited)
- Mary Liswood as Angie Fitch (uncredited)
- Miriam Scott as Poldi's nurse (uncredited)
- Elia Kazan as Cleaver (uncredited)

== Production ==
The screenplay for Panic in the Streets, originally titled Port of Entry, underwent several rounds of edits in order to conform to the Hays Code. In November 1949, a preliminary script was delivered to censor Joseph Breen of the Motion Picture Association of America (MPAA). Breen replied with changes needed for the script to avoid gruesome violence and the insinuation that Violet is a prostitute or that police officers have been killed. By December, the film had been renamed Outbreak. A series of communications between Breen and the studio occurred over the course of three months before scenes were changed. When the screenplay was finalized following the MPAA's approval on March 14, 1950, the film's title had been changed to Panic in the Streets and production began.

== Reception ==
In a contemporary review for The New York Times, critic Thomas M. Pryor wrote: "Although it is excitingly presented, 'Panic in the Streets' misses the mark as superior melodrama because it is not without obvious, sometimes annoying exaggeration that demands more indulgence than some spectators may be willing to contribute. However, there is an electric quality to the climax staged in a warehouse on the New Orleans waterfront that should compensate for minor annoyances which come to the surface spasmodically in 'Panic in the Streets.'"

Critic Philip K. Scheuer of the Los Angeles Times called the film a "crackling, exploding strip of cinematurgy" and wrote: "[T]he whole concept has a kind of grotesque tilt to it which Director Kazan reflects in both casting and treatment. It's crazy enough, in all seeming."

The film failed to recover its costs at the box office. Twentieth Century-Fox head Darryl F. Zanuck blamed the high cost of location shooting, stating that if the film had been produced for $850,000, it would have been profitable.

== Awards ==
Wins

- Venice Film Festival: International Award, Elia Kazan; 1950
- Academy Awards: Oscar, Best Writing, Motion Picture Story, Edna Anhalt and Edward Anhalt; 1951

Nominations

- Venice Film Festival: Golden Lion, Elia Kazan; 1950
- Writers Guild of America: WGA Award, Best Written American Drama, Richard Murphy; The Robert Meltzer Award (Screenplay Dealing Most Ably with Problems of the American Scene), Richard Murphy; 1951

== Home video ==
The film was released on DVD format as part of the Fox Film Noir collection, along with Laura and Call Northside 777, on March 15, 2005.
