= Mabel Barrison =

Canadian-American actress and singer

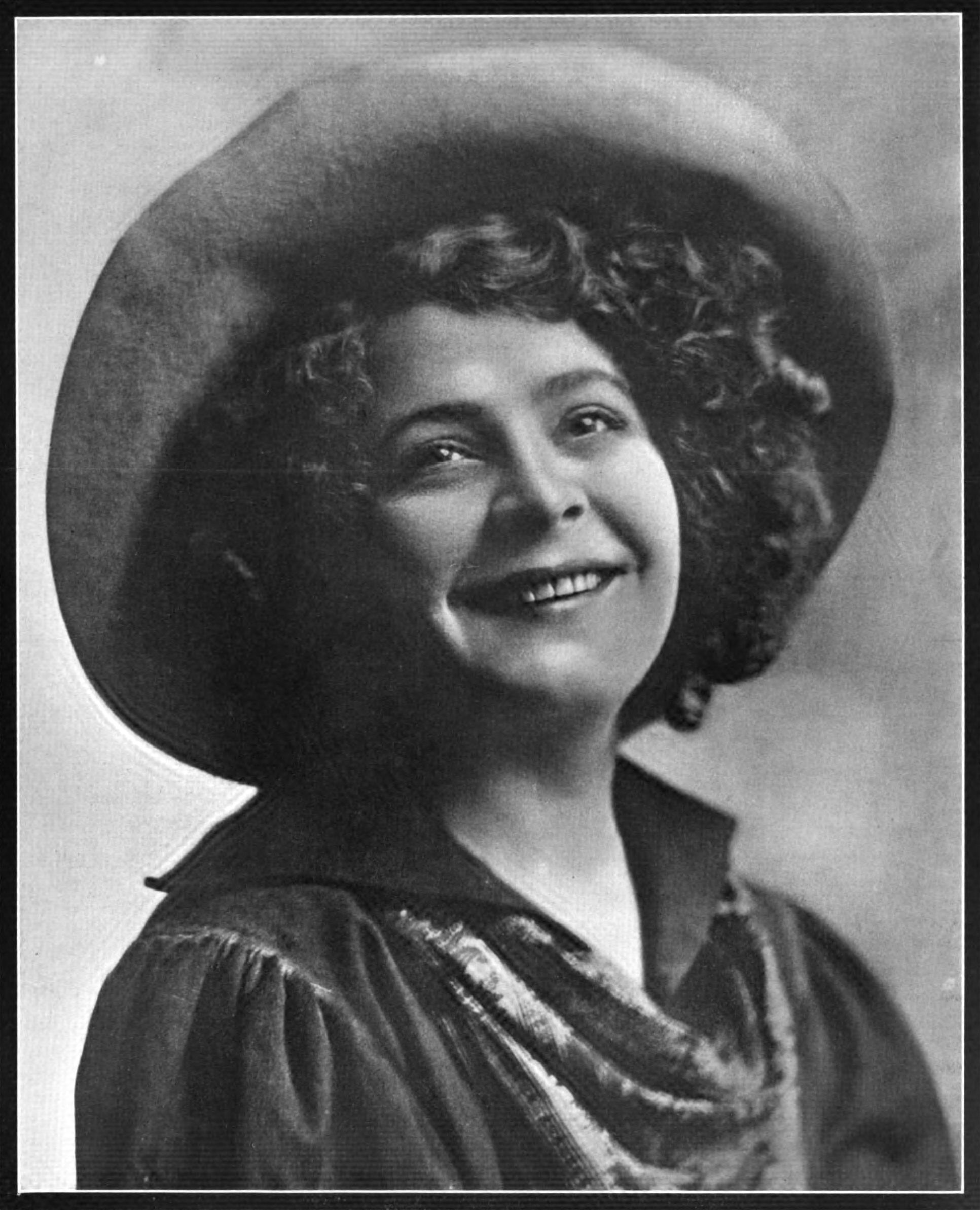
- Barrison in a 1908 publication
- Born: Eva Maud Farrance; April 21, 1882; Toronto, Ontario, Canada
- Died: November 1, 1912 (aged 30); Toronto, Ontario, Canada
- Occupations: Actress, singer
- Years active: 1890s-1910
- Spouse: Joseph E. Howard

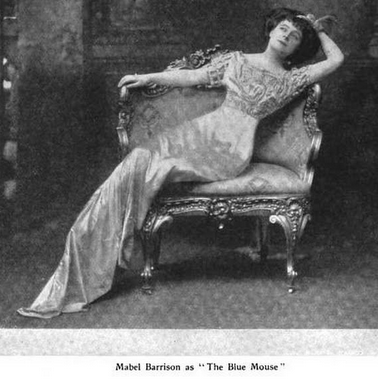
Barrison in 1909

Mabel Barrison (April 21, 1882 – November 1, 1912) was a Canadian born American stage actress and singer in the first decade of the 20th century. She was born Eva Farrance and joined a musical chorus while still in her teens. She appeared in vaudeville and on Broadway with Weber and Fields and was spotted by stage director Julian Mitchell for a role in the 1903 Babes in Toyland. "The Blue Mouse" was written by Clyde Fitch and Fitch himself selected Barrison for a role in the play. Barrison was plagued by health problems the last two years of her life. She died on November 1, 1912, in Toronto at the age of 30.

== Broadway plays ==
- Florodora (1900)
- Twirly Whirly(1902)
- Humming Birds and Onions (1902)
- The Stickiness of Gelatine (1902)
- The Big Little Princess (1903)
- Babes in Toyland (1903)
- Babes in Toyland (1905)(revival)
- The Land of Nod and The Song Birds (1907)
- The Flower of the Ranch (1908)
- The Blue Mouse (1908)
- Lulu's Husbands (1910)

== See also ==
- Lotta Faust
