= Glen MacDonough =

American playwright, lyricist and librettist (1870–1924)

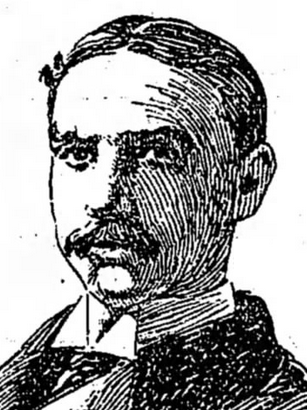
- Born: November 12, 1870; Brooklyn, New York, U.S.
- Died: March 30, 1924 (aged 53); Stamford, Connecticut, U.S.
- Occupations: Librettist, lyricist, playwright
- Notable work: Babes in Toyland
- Spouse: Margaret Jefferson (m. 1896)

Glen MacDonough (November 12, 1870 – March 30, 1924) was an American lyricist, librettist, and playwright.

He is best remembered today as the librettist of Victor Herbert's operetta Babes in Toyland (1903).

== Early life ==
MacDonough was born in Brooklyn, New York, the son of theater manager Thomas B. MacDonough and actress and writer Laura Don.

== Career ==
MacDonough started out as a feature/human interest journalist in New York City, and according to one source (The Atlanta Constitution, February 4, 1894), "...four years ago [MacDonough] was a reporter earning 15 to 20 dollars a week...but was rapidly advanced in salary and prominence. In one year on the New York Advertiser, he wrote 1,008 short stories...He [then] determined to abandon journalism and turn to the drama for a livelihood..."

The Prodigal Father (1892) is MacDonough's first work that received any note in reviews of the day. It was a comedy with songs, a form generally called "musical extravaganzas" at the time. His second work, The Algerian (1893), was a collaboration with songwriter Reginald DeKoven.

In the 1890s, he devoted much time to writing farces and comedies or the book and song lyrics to a string of musical comedies. These musical comedies include Miss Dynamite (1894) and Delmonico's at 6 (1895). MacDonough's name is associated with more than two dozen plays and musical works. Most of them have become obscure with the passage of time, but some—besides Babes in Toyland—are worthy of mention and present certain points of historical interest.

He wrote the lyrics for the operetta, Chris and the Wonderful Lamp (1899), with music by march king John Philip Sousa, a work that undergoes periodic revival even today. MacDonough was also one of the many lyricists called to help out in the first musical production of L. Frank Baum's The Wizard of Oz (1902).

Between 1896 and 1909, MacDonough collaborated with Herbert on four other operettas besides Babes in Toyland: The Gold Bug (1896), It Happened in Nordland (1905), Wonderland (1905), and Algeria (1908, revised in 1909 as The Rose of Algeria).

MacDonough was also the American adapter of Johann Strauss' last work, Vienna Life (1901), and of Franz Lehár's The Count of Luxembourg (1912).

In 1909, he wrote the book for The Midnight Sons.

He was one of the nine founding members of the American Society of Composers, Authors and Publishers (ASCAP) in 1914.

MacDonough wrote continuously until the year before his death in Stamford, Connecticut, on March 30, 1924. His last work was in 1923, Within Four Walls, a play.

== Personal life ==
MacDonough married Margaret Jefferson in 1896 in Buzzard's Bay, Massachusetts.

== See also ==
- Anna Alice Chapin
- List of people from Brooklyn
- List of people from Connecticut
- List of playwrights
- List of songwriters

== Sources ==
- Hischak, Thomas S. The Oxford Companion to the American Musical: Theatre, Film, and Television. Oxford University Press. USA. ISBN 978-0-19-533533-0
- The Cambridge Companion to the Musical, 2nd Edition, Publication date: May 2008. ISBN 978-0-521-86238-7
- The Atlanta Constitution, January 1, 1894; February 4, 1894.
- The Decatur Review. October 19, 1892.
- Cedar Rapids Evening Gazette, December 16, 1892.
- The Boston Daily Globe, October 3, 1893; September 29, 1894.
- Newark Daily Advocate, March 3, 1995.
