= A Wise Fool =

1921 film by George Melford

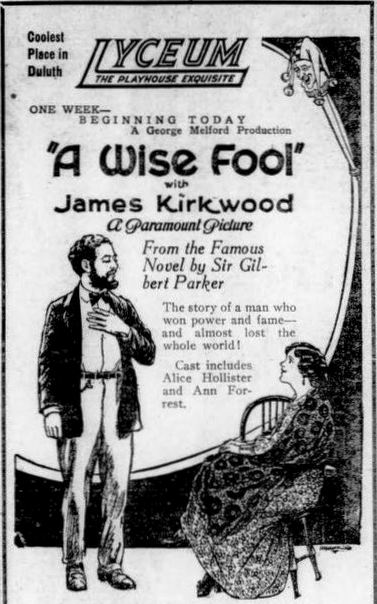
- Newspaper ad
- Directed by: George Melford
- Written by: Sir Gilbert Parker (adaptation)
- Based on: The Money Master by Sir Gilbert Parker
- Starring: James Kirkwood, Sr.
- Cinematography: William Marshall
- Production company: Famous Players–Lasky
- Distributed by: Famous Players–Lasky; Paramount Pictures
- Release date: June 26, 1921
- Country: United States
- Language: Silent (English intertitles)

A Wise Fool is a 1921 American silent drama film produced by Famous Players–Lasky and released by Paramount Pictures. This film is based on the novel The Money Master by Sir Gilbert Parker and was directed by George Melford. James Kirkwood is the star of the film. A copy is held at the Library of Congress.

== Plot ==
Based upon a description in a film publication, Jean Jacques Barbille, a wealthy egoist and philosopher in the small parish of Quebec, returns from Paris with Carmen Dolores, a Spanish girl, as his wife. When their daughter Zoe is grown, Carmen realizes that her husband neglects her, and finally leaves him. When Jean objects to her marriage, Zoe goes west with her lover. Then Jean's mill burns down, and his money is stolen. After long wanderings Jean comes upon his wife, who is ill in a convent. There is a reconciliation and then his daughter, who had been searching for Jean, and her husband arrive.

== Cast ==
- James Kirkwood as Jean Jacques Barbille
- Alice Hollister as Carmen Dolores
- Ann Forrest as Zoe Barbille
- Alan Hale as George Masson
- Fred Huntley as Sebastian Dolores
- William Boyd as Gerard Fynes
- Truly Shattuck as Virginia Poucette
- Harry Duffield as Fille
- Charles Ogle as Judge Carcasson
- John Herdman as The Curate
- Mabel Van Buren as Madame Langlois
- Wheeler Oakman (uncredited)
