= Truly Shattuck =

American actress

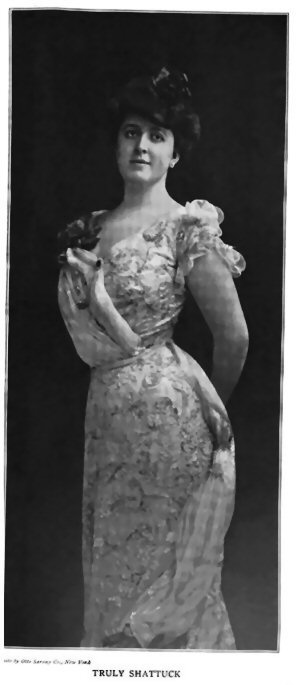
- Burr McIntosh Monthly August, 1905
- Born: Clarice Etrulia de Bucharde; July 27, 1875; San Miguel, California, U.S.
- Died: December 6, 1954 (aged 79); Woodland Hills, California, U.S.
- Occupation: Musical Actress
- Spouse: Stephen A. Douglas,

Truly Shattuck (July 27, 1875 – December 6, 1954) was a soubrette star of vaudeville, music halls, and Broadway whose career began in tragedy and ended in relative obscurity.

== Early life ==
Truly Shattuck was born in San Miguel, San Luis Obispo County, California in an adobe house adjoining the historic Mission San Miguel Arcángel. Her birth name was said to be Clarice Etrulia de Burchards (or Burcharde). Shattuck was the surname of her stepfather, and her mother was Jane Shattuck.

In 1893 Jane Shattuck murdered Harry Poole, her daughter's boyfriend, after he refused to commit to marriage after the couple spent the night together. Shattuck's mother was originally convicted of first degree murder, but was later released after winning a temporary insanity appeal. At the time Shattuck was a chorus girl at the Tivoli Opera House in San Francisco and as a result of the national exposure generated by Poole's murder, her career began to take seed.

== Career ==
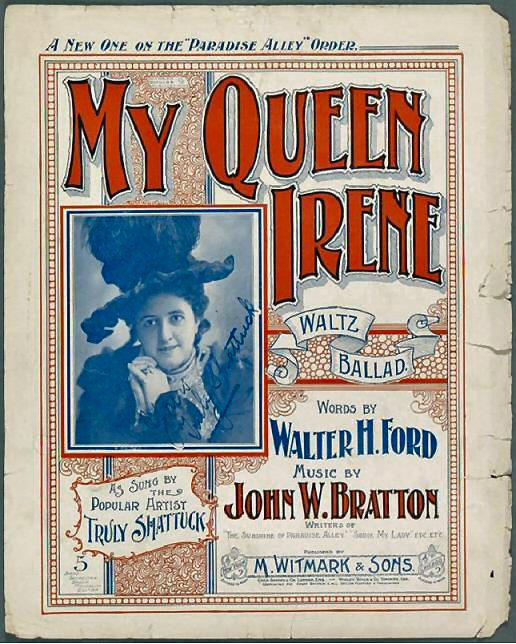
New York Public Library Digital Gallery, My queen Irene, she is the best girl I've seen. [first line ...] ([c1899])

Shattuck made her first New York vaudeville appearance at Tony Pastor's theater in 1896. Her first major role came the following year playing Mephisto in Very Little Faust and Much Marguerite, staged at Hammerstein's Olympia Theatre. Shattuck went on to tour for a number of seasons as a lead performer in several traveling burlesque and vaudeville companies. When John Philip Sousa's marches were the rage in the 1890s, Truly caused a bit of controversy by putting words to his music and singing them at music halls such as Koster & Bial's in New York. Shattuck spent the last year or so of the 19th century in Germany performing at Berlin and Dresden before supporting Edna May in the 1900 London production of An American Beauty,

In 1904 she went from vaudeville to Broadway to play Celestine in the musical An English Daisy, at the Casino Theatre and later that year in George M. Cohan's Little Johnny Jones at the Liberty Theatre. In 1906 she played Mrs. Franklin-Jones-Berrymore in the musical farce The Governor's Son staged at the Aerial Gardens (now the New Amsterdam Roof). She created the role of Violette in A Parisian Model at the Broadway Theatre in 1906 and the following year she played Adelaide Forster (the lady) in the George Broadhurst play The Lady from Lane's staged at the Lyric Theatre and Casino Theatre. Her last Broadway roles came in 1910 as Trixie Stole in Judy Forgot at the Broadway Theatre and as Alma in “Alma, Where Do You Live?” with Weber and Fields

She was the first to sing Ernest R. Ball's 1906 song Love Me, and the World Is Mine and the following year began an extensive European tour performing at music halls in St. Petersburg, Vienna, Berlin, Dresden, Hamburg, Frankfort and London. Throughout her early career she was a frequent performer with Weber and Fields in shows like Hip! Hip! Hooray! as Vera Shapeleigh at Weber's Theatre in November, 1907.

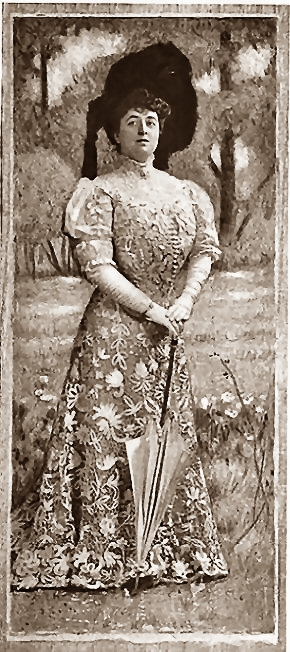
Burr McIntosh Monthly, 1906

In 1910 Shattuck declared bankruptcy in a New York court with nearly $2,800 liabilities and no assets. It was reported in the press at the time that her extravagant lifestyle, expensive cars, clothes and a yacht, caused her downfall. Her husband, Stephen A. Douglas, claimed that she went through a half-million dollars in four years. The two wed in 1899, and according to the press spent very little time together over their marriage. Douglas, who was salesman, was granted a divorce in 1914 some four years after he filed on the grounds of desertion.

On October 13, 1911, she was rushed to Johns Hopkins Hospital suffering from a brain abscess. She had been in Baltimore performing at the Academy of Music in Alma, Where Do You Live? and would be absent from the stage for nearly two years. She returned to vaudeville in 1913 with a new partner, Thomas A. Wise, a comedian who played in The Lady From Lane's. In 1919 she received positive reviews with Emma O'Neil in their vaudeville skit Punctuating Life's Manuscript.

Shattuck turned to Hollywood in 1915 and over the next twelve years would appear in some sixteen silent films. Her first known movie was The Iron Strain, in which she played Mrs. Van Ness. Her last was in 1927 as Mrs. P. Belmont-Fox in Rubber Heels. At the time of the taking of the 1920 US census Shattuck was recorded as a house guest of Rudolph K Hynicka and his young wife Dorothy at their Los Angeles residence. Hyincka was a journalist who rose to control virtually every political appointments in Cincinnati over some two decades.

== Later years ==
After her vaudeville and film career closed, Shattuck was reduced to working as a waitress and later as a seamstress, but was unable to hold on to either job for very long. In September 1929, after several months of unemployment, Shattuck was arrested in Chicago for trying to shoplift a $16.50 green dress. She later pleaded guilty, but was released after the department store dropped the charges. One paper quoted her saying, “A woman must dress if she wants to work.” A year later it was reported that she had been appointed personal secretary to a Mrs. A. L. Erlanger.

In 1930, Dr. Henry J. Shireson, a cosmetic surgeon, lost his medical license after one of his patients had to have her legs amputated after he attempted to correct her bow-legs (genu varum). It came out in the investigation that a decade earlier he had performed weight loss surgeries on Shattuck, Sophie Tucker and several other celebrities of the day.

Shattuck was among the more than two hundred mourners who attended Fatty Arbuckle's funeral in New York in July 1933.

During the remainder of her life, Shattuck would periodically return to the stage and on occasion perform in radio productions. In 1935, Hollywood reporter Alan McElwain listed her among a group of once-popular performers working at the time for $7.50 a-day as a movie bit player.

== Death ==
Shattuck died at the age 79 after an extended illness at the Motion Picture Country Home on Mulholland Drive in Woodland Hills, California.

== Partial filmography ==
- Peggy (1916)
- A Wise Fool (1921)
- The Speed Girl (1921)
- Beauty's Worth (1922)
- The Glory of Clementina (1922)
- The Hottentot (1922)
- Daughters of the Rich (1923)
- Rubber Heels (1927)
