= Dance of the Seven Veils =

Dance of Inanna, Salome

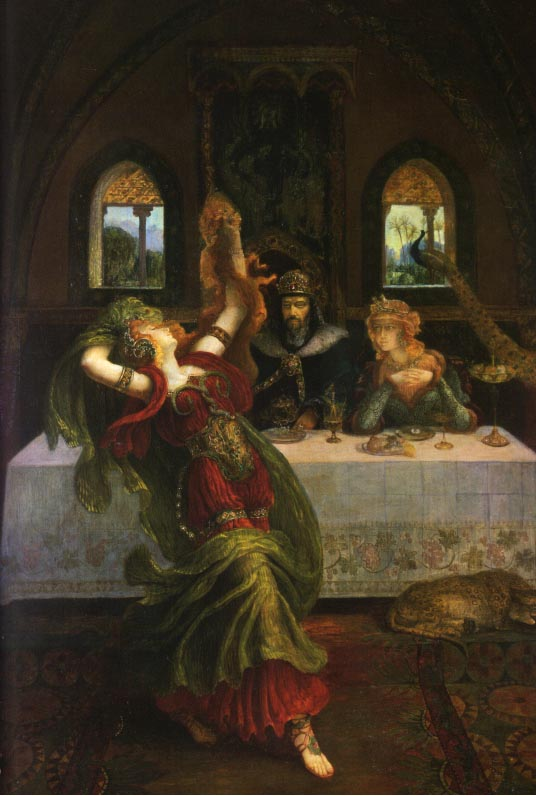
Dance of Salome. Armand Point, 1898

The Dance of the Seven Veils is the dance performed by Salome before King Herod Antipas in modern stage, literature, and visual arts. It is an elaboration on the New Testament story of the Feast of Herod and the execution of John the Baptist, which refers to Salome dancing before the king, but does not give the dance a name.

The name "Dance of the Seven Veils" was chiefly popularized in modern culture with the 1894 English translation of Oscar Wilde's 1893 French play Salome in the stage direction "Salome dances the dance of the seven veils". This dance was later incorporated into Richard Strauss's 1905 opera Salome and was the subject of a brief "Salomania" in popular culture.

== Biblical account ==
According to ten verses of Matthew 14, John was imprisoned for criticizing King Herod Antipas's marriage to Herodias, the former wife of Antipas's half-brother Herod II. Herod offered his unnamed niece a reward of her choice for performing a dance for his guests on his birthday. Herodias persuaded her daughter to ask for John the Baptist's head on a platter. Against his better judgment, Herod reluctantly acceded to her request.

A similar account is recorded in Mark 6.

== Josephus ==
The Romano-Jewish historian Josephus lists Antipas's stepdaughter's name as Salome, but makes no mention of a dance nor makes any connection between Salome and John the Baptist.

== Oscar Wilde ==
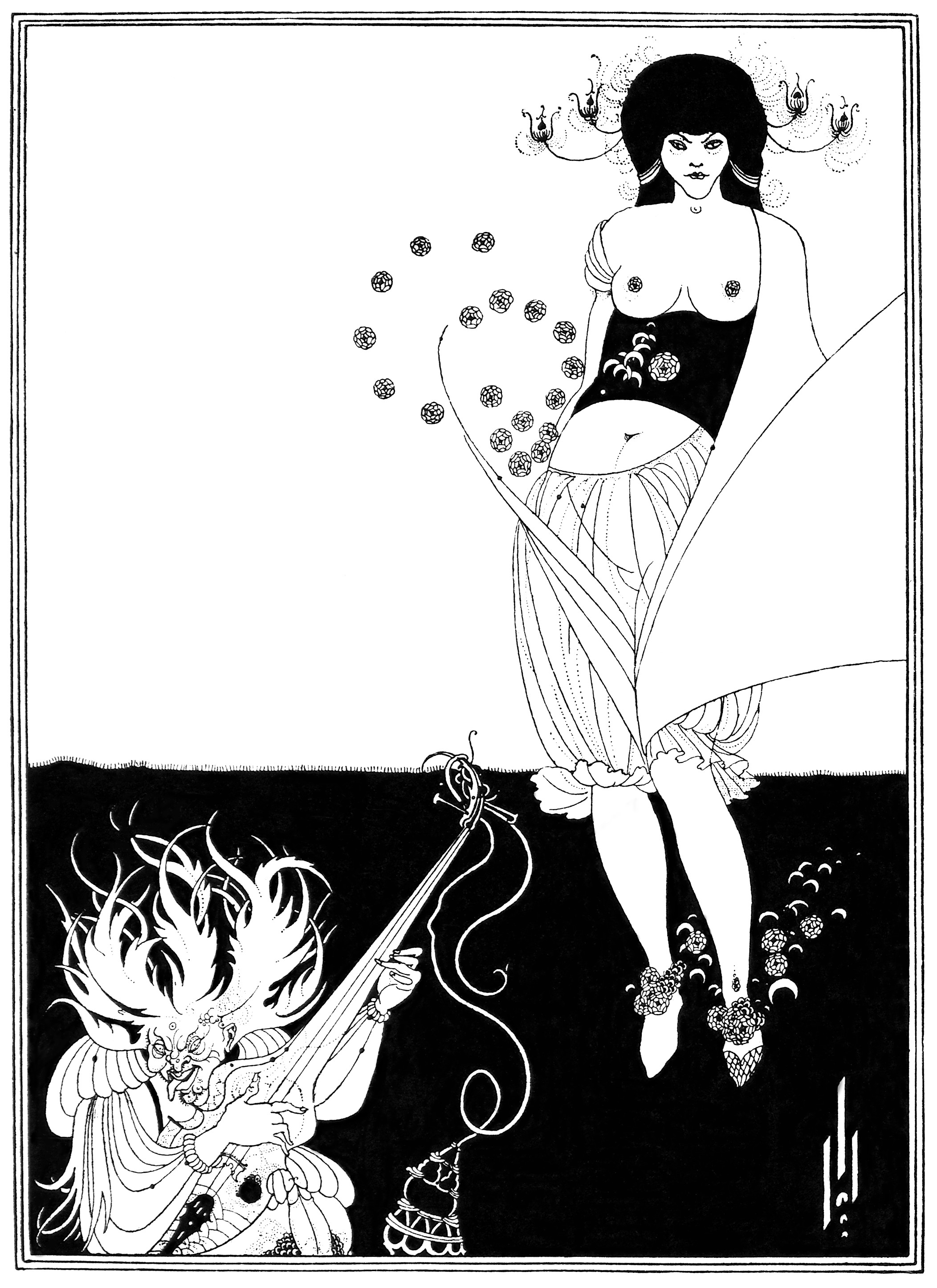
The Stomach Dance by Aubrey Beardsley, an interpretation of the Dance of the Seven Veils

The idea that Salome's dance involves "seven veils" originates with Wilde's 1891 play Salomé. Wilde was influenced by earlier French writers who had transformed the image of Salome into an incarnation of female lust. Rachel Shteir writes that,

To the French, Salome was not a woman at all, but a brute, insensible force: Huysmans refers to her as "the symbolic incarnation of undying Lust ... the monstrous Beast, indifferent, irresponsible, insensible"; and Mallarmé describes her as being inscrutable: "the veil always remains." Huysmans' hero Des Esseintes characterizes her as a "weird and superhuman figure he had dreamed of..... [I]n her quivering breasts, ... heaving belly, ... tossing thighs ... she was now revealed as the symbol incarnate of old world vice."

Wilde was especially influenced by Gustave Flaubert's story "Herodias" in which Salome dances on her hands to please Antipas. This type of dance was common among "gypsy" acrobats in the 19th century. Wilde at first intended to follow Flaubert's version, but changed his mind. Shireen Malik says he may have been influenced by the 1870 poem "The Daughter of Herodias" by Arthur O'Shaughnessy which describes Salome dancing:

She freed and floated on the air her arms
Above dim veils that hid her bosom's charms...
The veils fell round her like thin coiling mists
Shot through by topaz suns and amethysts.

The poem goes on to describe brief views of her "jewelled body" as the flowing veils swirl and part.

Wilde transforms the dance from a public performance for his guests, as in the Bible, to a personal dance for the king himself. He gives no description of the dance beyond the name, but the idea of a series of veils has been connected to a process of unveiling. As Malik says, "although Wilde does not describe Salome's dance or suggest that she remove any veils, her dance is invariably assumed to be one of unveiling, thus revealing herself." Wilde's play has even been proposed as the origin of striptease. Toni Bentley writes "Wilde's bracketed brevity allowed for a world of interpretation. Can the invention of striptease be traced to a single innocuous stage direction in a censored play that could barely find a theater or audience? Can Oscar Wilde be considered the unlikely father of modern striptease?"

In one of Aubrey Beardsley's illustrations to the play, he depicts what he calls a "stomach dance" (i.e., a belly dance), in which Salome is depicted with exposed breasts and undulating belly, wearing transparent pantaloons. Wilde wrote a note in appreciation of Beardsley's design, saying: "For Aubrey: for the only artist who, besides myself, knows what the dance of the seven veils is, and can see that invisible dance." The concept of "belly dancing" had become widely known in 1893, the year before Beardsley created his designs, when it was featured at the World's Fair in Chicago that year.

=== Origin of the "veil" dance ===
A poster for a performance by Loïe Fuller at the Folies Bergère

Bentley notes that the Mesopotamian goddess Inanna "performed the first documented striptease" when she descended into the Kur (underworld), ruled by her sister Ereshkigal, in search of her faithless lover Dumuzid. Inanna had to divest herself of the mysterious "seven mé" (conjecturally, her various jewels and robes) in her descent through seven successive gates leading ever deeper into the underworld until at last she stood naked in the 'land of no return.' Oscar Wilde assigned this symbolic descent to the underworld of the unconscious, a ceremony that equates stripping naked to being in a state of truth, the ultimate unveiling, to Salome." Writing from a Jungian perspective, Perera has demonstrated the same for the far older Sumerian myth of the descent of Inanna. Wilde may have learned of the descent of the goddess by his acquaintance with Oxford professor Archibald Sayce, who lectured and published an English translation of this text.

Wilde's concept of "seven veils" is believed to be derived from the popularity of what were known as veil dances at the time. These were westernised versions of imagined Middle Eastern styles of dance. The dancer Loïe Fuller was especially associated with such dances. In 1886, Fuller appeared at New York's Standard Theatre in a show called The Arabian Nights. According to Rhonda Garelick, this "featured fourteen different Oriental dance numbers, including the 'Veil of Vapor' dance, done with clouds of steam instead of fabric veils."

The Hebrew word makhól (מָחוֹל), meaning to twist or whirl (in a circular or spiral manner), is used in Judges 21:21–23, Judges 11:34, and I Samuel 18:6–7. In some instances it refers to a type of erotic or courtship dance performed by women. Most notably, in Canaan before 900 BC, a small piece of cloth worn around the hips (ḥagor), would have been all that was worn.

== Richard Strauss ==
Strauss's operatic adaptation of the play also features the Dance of the Seven Veils. The dance remains unnamed except in the acting notes, but Salome's sexual fascination with John seems to motivate the request—though Herod is portrayed as pleased. The music for the dance comes from near the climax of the opera. The visual content of that scene (about seven minutes long with standard tempi) has varied greatly depending on the aesthetic notions of the stage director, choreographer, and soprano, and on the choreographic skills and body shape of that singer. Strauss himself stipulated that the dance should be "thoroughly decent, as if it were being done on a prayer mat." Nevertheless, many productions made the dance explicitly erotic. In a 1907 production in New York the dancer "spared the audience nothing in active and suggestive detail", to such an extent that some ladies in the audience "covered their eyes with their programs."

Ernst Krause argues that Strauss's version of the dance "established the modern musical formula for the portrayal of ecstatic sensual desire and brought it to perfection." In Derek B. Scott's view, "The eroticism of the 'Dance of the Seven Veils' is encoded in the sensual richness (timbral and textual) of a huge orchestra, the quasi-Oriental embellishment of melody (intimations of 'exotic' sensuality), and the devices of crescendo and quickening pace (suggestive of growing excitement)."

== Later versions ==
The Wilde play and the Strauss opera led to the phenomenon of "Salomania", in which various performers put on acts inspired by Salome's erotic dance. Several of these were criticised for being salacious and close to stripping, leading to "insistent vogue for women doing glamorous and exotic 'oriental' dances in striptease". In 1906 Maud Allan's production "Vision of Salomé" opened in Vienna. Based loosely on Wilde's play, her version of the Dance of the Seven Veils became famous (and to some notorious) and she was billed as "The Salomé Dancer". Her version was praised for the "eastern spirit" of her dancing without the "vulgarities familiar to the tourists in Cairo or Tangier". The dance first appeared in film in 1908 in a Vitagraph production entitled Salome, or the Dance of the Seven Veils.

Brigid Bazlen as Salomé in the biblical epic King of Kings (1961)

In the 1953 film Salome, starring Rita Hayworth, depicts her instead as a downtrodden early convert to John's Christianity. She is manipulated into a strip dance, believing she can ask Herod to spare John, only to stop the dance before removing her last veil when she sees John's head delivered on a platter.

In the 1961 film King of Kings, Salomé, portrayed by Brigid Bazlen, performs a similar dance; her voluptuous seduction of a drunken lascivious Herod Antipas remains highly praised and is now widely regarded as Bazlen's best performance.

In the 1977 television miniseries Jesus of Nazareth, Salomé is portrayed by Spanish actress Isabel Mestres and king Herod Antipas by Christopher Plummer.

Salome and the dance are recurring thematic and plot elements in Tom Robbins's 1990 novel Skinny Legs and All.
