= Salomania =

Popular fascination with the historical figure of Salome

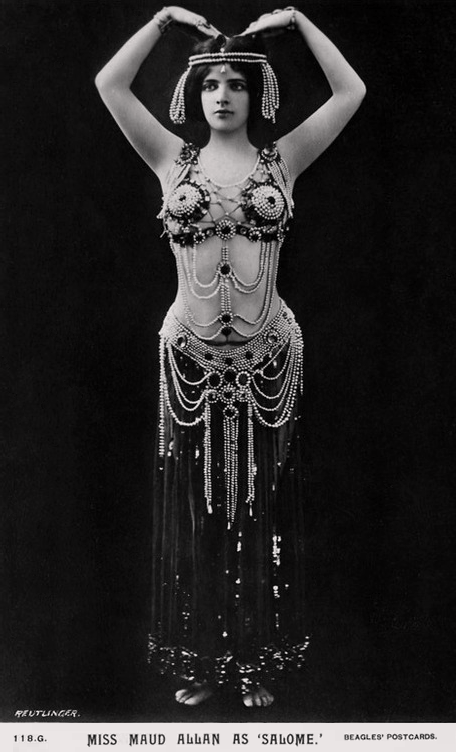
Maud Allan as Salome

Salomania was a popular fascination with the historical figure of Salome and her imagined "Dance of the Seven Veils", observed across film, dance, theatre, and music roughly from 1900 to 1930. The concept of a "Seven Veils" dance originated in Oscar Wilde's 1891 play Salome, adapted and popularized by Richard Strauss's 1905 opera of the same name. The term Salomania came into common usage after appearing in The New York Times in 1908, and was "almost instantaneous in Western Europe, after the triumphant first performance of Strauss's opera (which received no less than thirty-eight curtain calls). Every country on the continent, indeed every city, had its own Salome-in-residence."

== Overview ==
The character of Salome as depicted in these works was a seductive and dangerous femme fatale. The combination of Wilde's subversive vision and Strauss's striking music propelled Salome's story—and particularly her infamous dance—into widespread public awareness. The new Salome was no longer a Biblical footnote but a cultural force of female desire and destruction.

Though briefly mentioned in ancient texts, the story of Salome underwent a dramatic transformation. The Bible (Mark 6:21–29 and Matthew 14:6–11) and the Roman historian Flavius Josephus describe Salome as a Jewish princess, daughter of Herodias and stepdaughter of King Herod. She danced before the king and, at her mother's insistence, demanded the severed head of John the Baptist on a silver platter as a reward. In these early accounts, Salome's original character was that of a dutiful daughter with little personal agency. By the early 20th century, however, she had been reinvented into a dangerous, sexualized figure—one that both shocked standards of good taste and helped usher in new ideas about art, personal freedom, and gender roles.

At the heart of Salomania was the dance, a moment of heightened sensuality that Salome performs before King Herod. Wilde's stage directions (as well as those of Strauss) were limited, opening the door for choreographers and dancers to interpret it in sensational ways. The most common interpretation was to represent Salome as a figure drawn from Western fantasies of the exotic "Orient", including skimpy skin-baring costumes.

Each performer brought their own spin to the dance, ranging from subtle, suggestive movements to increasingly provocative and often scandalous interpretations. Costuming, or in some cases strategic disrobing, became a defining element of these stage spectacles, ensuring that the performance was as visually arresting as it was thematically transgressive.

Among the many performers who embraced the role of Salome, Maude Allan became one of the most celebrated. Her self-styled production, often called The Vision of Salomé, captured international attention. Allan's costuming and free dance movements were provocative for the time, and she quickly became synonymous with the Salome archetype. Other prominent performers, such as Loie Fuller, Eva Tanguay, Gertrude Hoffmann, Mademoiselle Dazie, and others also engaged with the broader themes of Salomania. Although not all of their works were strictly Salome dances, their fascination with the exotic, theatrical, and modern dance innovations placed them within the same cultural wave. These dancers fostered an air of mysticism and otherworldly staging that recalled the decadent aura of Wilde's Salome.

Salomania performances also played a role in the suffrage movement, particularly in pre–World War I London. A group of London actresses staged a private performance of Wilde's Salome in 1911. Feminist actresses were drawn to Salome's dance because it allowed women to claim possession of their own erotic gaze, albeit a hostile and aggressive one. The Salome figure was not just an erotic spectacle for men's pleasure. She was also an influence on women performers and audiences, a vehicle for female self-expression and sexualized assertiveness. The Salome craze encouraged women to break free from old constraints and become independent social actors.

Salomania had a major impact on motion pictures. German director Oskar Messter made the short film Tanz der Salome in 1906, starring the notorious nude dancer Adorée Villany. In 1908, Vitagraph released Salome or Dance of the Seven Veils starring Florence Lawrence. Many Salome movies followed from film-makers around the world. Among the most notable were Fox's Salome (1918), featuring the well-known "vamp" Theda Bara in the title role, and Alla Nazimova's Salomé (1923). Salome (1953) starred Rita Hayworth Salome and Al Pacino and Jessica Chastain appeared in a film adaptation of the play in 2013.
