= The Wild Girl (1917 film) =

1917 film directed by Howard Estabrook

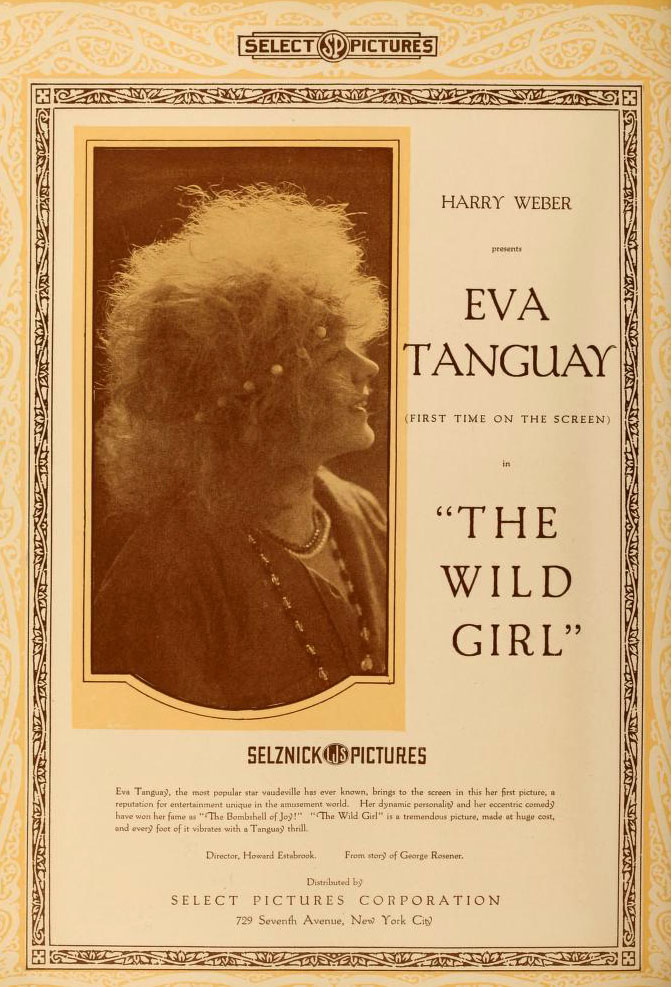
- Directed by: Howard Estabrook
- Written by: George Rosener
- Produced by: Harry Weber
- Starring: Eva Tanguay; Stuart Holmes; Tom Moore
- Cinematography: Frank Kugler
- Production company: Eva Tanguay Films
- Distributed by: Selznick Pictures
- Release date: September 1917
- Running time: 5 reels
- Country: United States
- Languages: Silent; English intertitles

The Wild Girl is a 1917 American silent comedy film directed by Howard Estabrook and starring Eva Tanguay, Stuart Holmes, and Tom Moore.

== Cast ==
- Eva Tanguay as Firefly
- Stuart Holmes as Andrio
- Tom Moore as Donald MacDonald
- Dean Raymond as Undetermined Role
- Valerie Bergere as Undetermined Role
- John Davidson as Undetermined Role
- Herbert Evans as Leo
- Nora Cecil as Undetermined Role

== Bibliography ==
- Andrew L. Erdman. Queen of Vaudeville: The Story of Eva Tanguay. Cornell University Press, 2012 .
