= Gertrude Hoffmann (dancer) =

American vaudeville dancer and choreographer

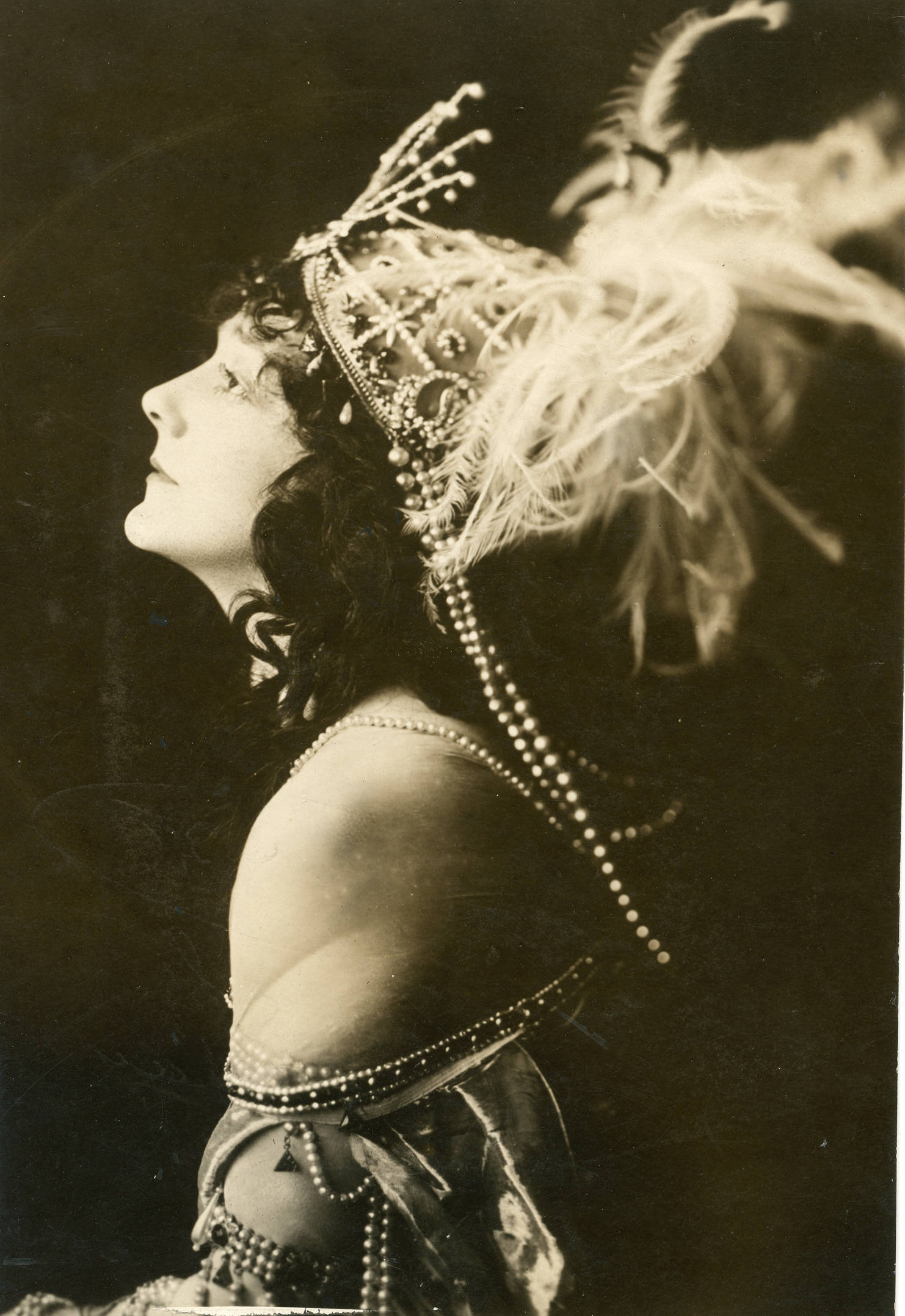
- Born: Katherine Gertrude Hay; May 7, 1883; San Francisco, California, U.S.
- Died: October 21, 1966 (aged 83); Los Angeles, California, U.S.
- Other name: Kitty
- Occupations: Performance dancer and choreographer
- Years active: 1900–1929
- Spouse: Max Hoffmann (m. 1901; died 1963)
- Children: Max Hoffman, Jr.

Katherine Gertrude Hoffmann (née Hay, May 7, 1883 – October 21, 1966) was an American early 20th-century vaudeville dancer and choreographer.

== Early life ==
Katherine "Kitty" Gertrude Hay was born in San Francisco on May 7, 1883, the daughter of John and Katherine (née Brogan) Hay. Her father, who was born in Bangor, Maine, in 1843, came to California sometime before 1873. Katherine Brogan was born in Ireland around 1847 and came to America in the early 1860s. John and Katherine Hay moved to Portland, Oregon, where John died in 1914. Katherine Brogan Hay died in 1926 at the Long Island summer house of her daughter, Gertrude. Gertrude received her early education at a San Francisco area Catholic convent.

Katherine had been performing on stage for some time as Kitty Hayes before catching the eye of actress Florence Roberts playing a French dancer in Jules Massenet’s five-act opera Sapho at San Francisco’s Alcazar Theatre. Not long after Robert's encouragement to pursue a career in dance, Gertrude signed on at the age of sixteen as a dancer with the vaudeville comedy team of Matthews and Bulger and began a tour that would eventually take her to New York City and the Paradise Roof Garden atop Oscar Hammerstein's Victoria Theatre.

== Career ==
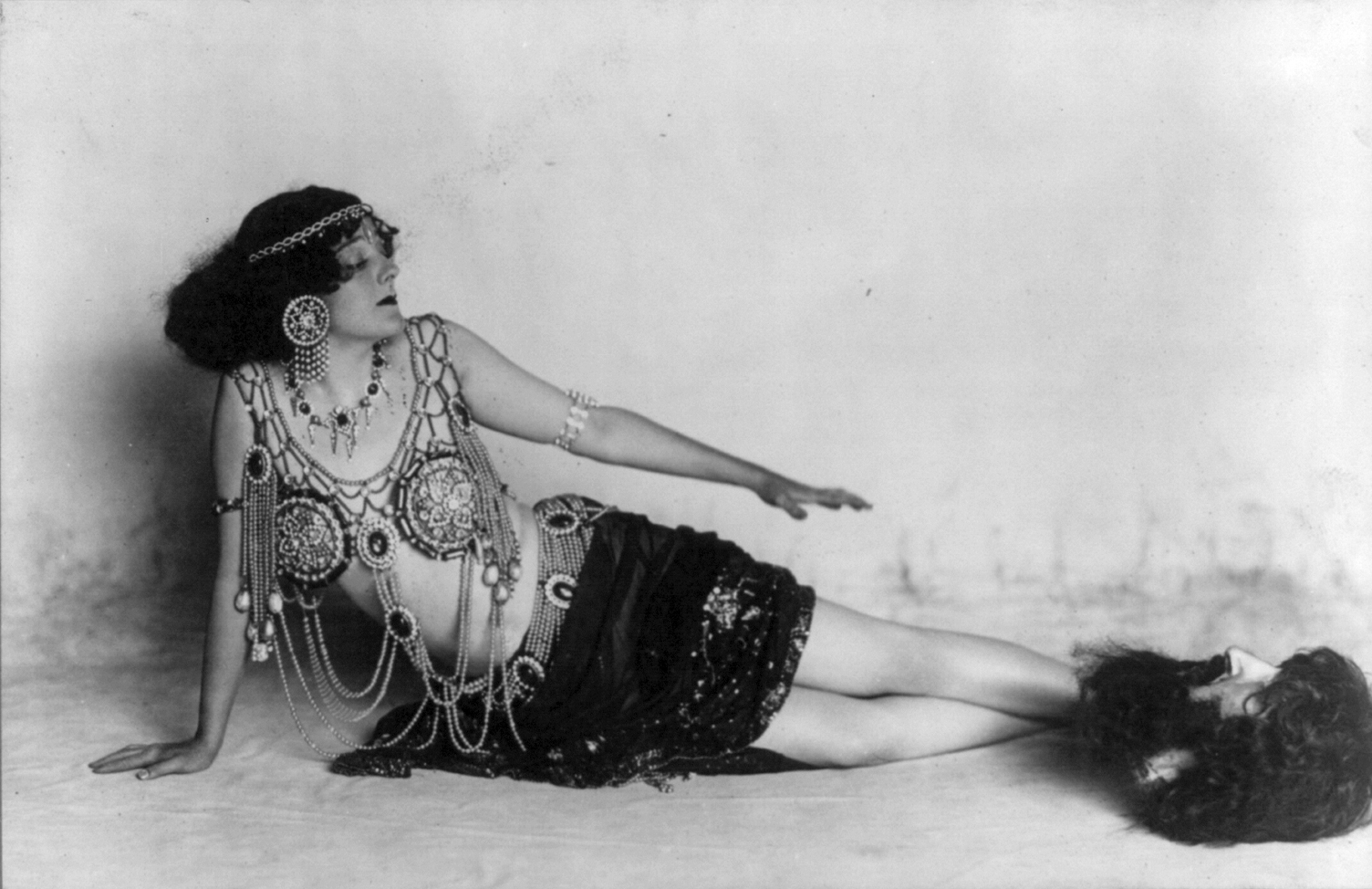
Hoffmann as Salome with the head of John the Baptist, 1908

In 1903, Gertrude Hoffmann was hired as a rehearsal director at Oscar Hammerstein’s Victoria Theater, working with the sixty-member "Punch and Judy Co." shows and other vaudeville routines performing at the venue. Willie Hammerstein persuaded her to appear on the stage. Three years later she replaced an ill performer in Ziegfeld’s "The Parisian Dancer" and became a hit imitating Anna Held singing "I Just Can't Make My Eyes Behave". Over her career, Gertrude also did impersonations of various other performers, such as Eva Tanguay, Eddie Foy, and Ethel Barrymore.

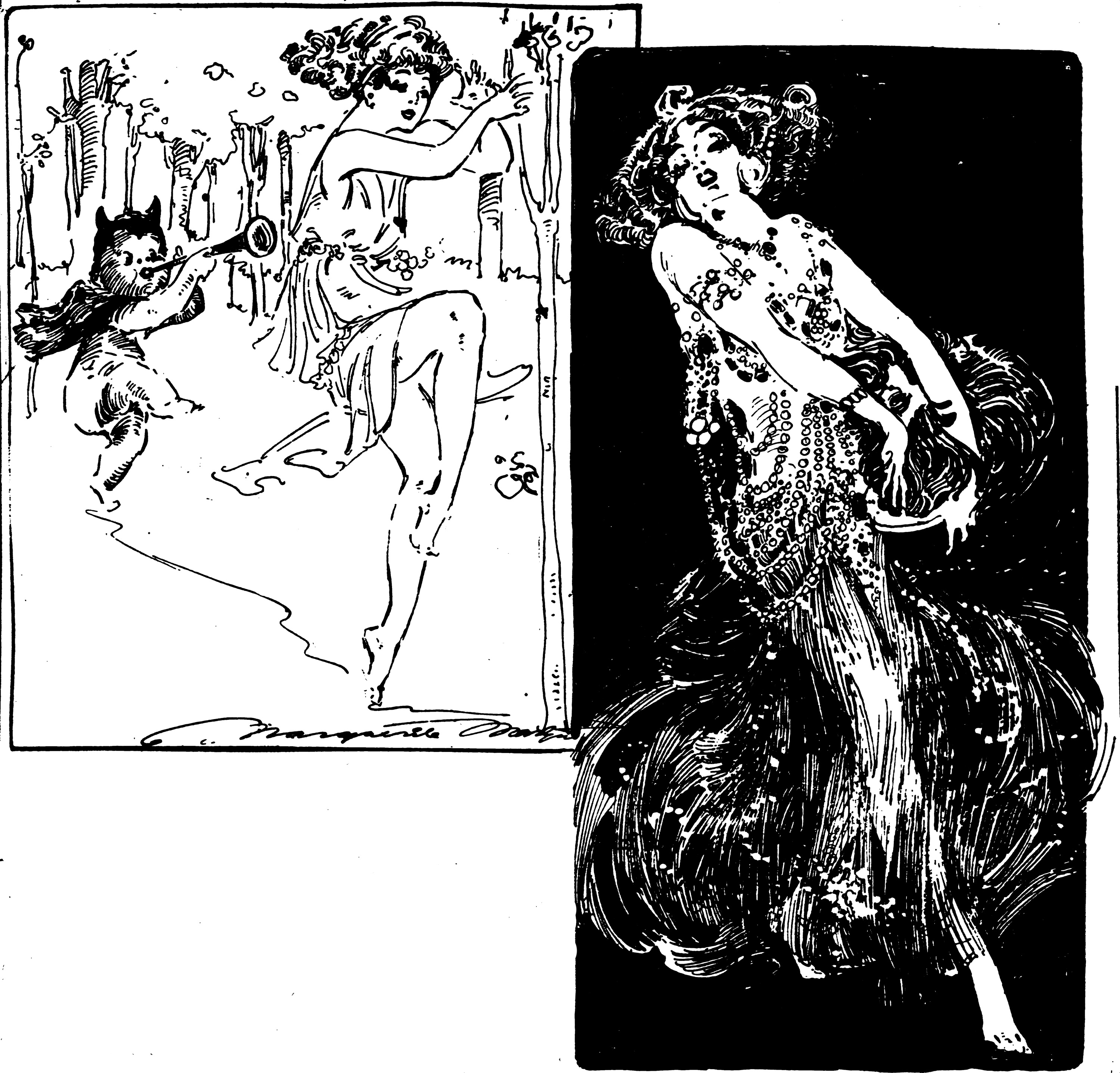
Hoffman as drawn by Marguerite Martyn for the St. Louis Post-Dispatch, 1909

Her choreography and special dance effects brought her high praise and rebuke. Her interpretive Salome dance, which she first performed in 1908, brought her fame while causing scandal at many theater houses nationwide. On several occasions, her suggestive Salome dance in scant costumes led to her arrest by local police. Following Hoffman's success, dancers as diverse as Eva Tanguay, Vera Olcott, Lotta Faust, Ruth St. Denis, La Sylphe, and Ada Overton Walker offered a burlesque Salome dance as part of the popular craze known as "Salomania."

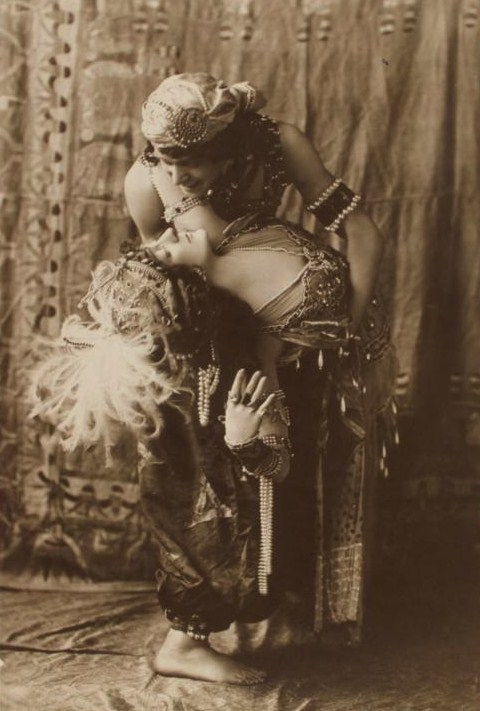
Publicity photo of Hoffmann and Theodore Kosloff in Scheherazade (1911)

Having spent the summer in Paris, Hoffmann recognized the Ballets Russes dance company's significance to Western dance and undertook intensive study of Russian technique, first with a dancer from Sergei Diaghilev's troupe and later with a teacher she brought from St. Petersburg. By 1911, she had assembled a company of roughly one hundred Russian and French dancers in New York, including Theodore Kosloff as ballet master, Lydia Lopokova, and Alexander Volinine, supported by a seventy-five-piece orchestra conducted by her husband, Max Hoffmann, and Fauvist-inspired scenery by Golow of the Moscow Imperial Opera.

In June 1911, at the Winter Garden Theatre in New York City, Hoffmann premiered Saisons des Ballets Russes, featuring reconstructed versions of Michel Fokine's Schéhérazade, Cléopâtra, and Les Sylphides, staged by Kosloff without Fokine's authorization. The production was successful, and the company toured nationally after an extended New York engagement.

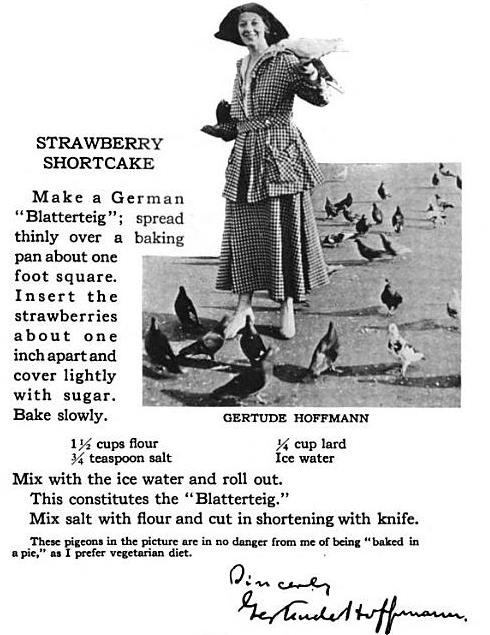
Celebrated Actor Folks' Cookeries 1916

Later in her career, she became manager and choreographer of the Gertrude Hoffmann Girls. Reminiscent of the Tiller Girls, her dancers used a type of athletic acrobatic transformation of the chorus girl with kicks, leaps, etc. The Gertrude Hoffmann Girls performed in the Shubert review Artists and Models that ran for the entire 1925-26 season at the Winter Garden and also had long runs over the following two seasons with A Night in Paris and A Night in Spain. In 1933, she resurrected the Hoffmann dancers and had some success touring America and Europe before the outbreak of the Second World War. Not much is known of her later life other than she may have at one time operated a dance studio or club in Southern California.

== Marriage ==
Gertrude married Max Hoffmann (1873–1963), a composer, songwriter and vaudeville orchestra leader, on April 8, 1901 in Baltimore. Her husband's full name and title was said to be "Baron" Adolph Eugene Victor Maximilian Hoffmann. Though born in Poland most likely of German descent, the title "Baron" is dubious since he was raised in St. Paul, Minnesota. On most public records and travel documents, their surname was recorded as Hoffmann rather than Hoffman. Max Hoffmann throughout their marriage worked with Gertrude as her music director and manager. Their son, professionally known as Max Hoffman, Jr. (1902–1945), was born the year following their marriage at Norfolk, Virginia and would go on to be a musical-comedy performer on Broadway and in films. Max Jr. was, for a brief period, married to the noted Boop-Boop-a-Doop singer Helen Kane.

== Death ==
Gertrude Hoffmann died on 21 October 1966 in Los Angeles, California.

== Legacy ==
In 2006 the social historian Armond Fields listed Gertrude Hoffmann in his book Women Vaudeville Stars: Eighty Biographical Profiles. The Gertrude Hoffmann Glide, a two-step or turkey-trot dance named after her in 1913, was recorded by the Victor Military Band and sold through Sears Catalogs.
