= The Midnight Sons =

1909 musical comedy by John Raymond Hubbell

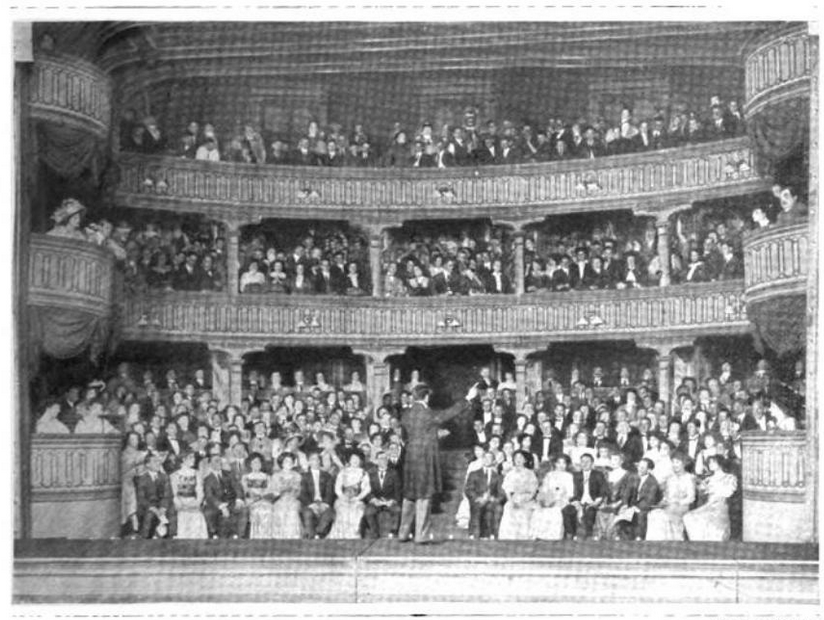
- Interior theatre scene from Act 2
- Original language: English
- Written by: Music by Raymond Hubbell; Book by Glen MacDonough
- Genre: Musical comedy

Premiere
- Date: 22 May 1909
- Place: Broadway Theatre (41st Street)

The Midnight Sons is a 1909 American musical comedy that was popular upon its release.

The music was by Raymond Hubbell with a book by Glen MacDonough. Opening on May 22, 1909, it ran for 257 performances at the old Broadway Theatre in New York City.

== Plot ==
In New York City, Senator Constant Noyes has four sons who are compelled to find jobs, and the loose plot follows these attempts.

Act 2 opened with the audience facing a false theater set filled with actors and wax dummies, before which the cast would give little performances with their back to the real audience. The set audience included likenesses of famous New Yorkers including theatre critics. Arthur Voegtlin was the set designer.

Blanche Ring's performance of "I've Got Rings On My Fingers (And Bells On My Toes)" became the hit of the show.

== Reception ==
Staged by Lew Fields as a "summer" offering, it had preview performances outside New York and play opened on May 22, 1909, at the old Broadway Theatre.

The play was quite popular with audiences and critics. After running for 257 performances on Broadway, it went on tour starting on January 1, 1910. After cast member Lotta Faust died in early 1910 of pneumonia, a benefit performance of the play was performed at the Broadway in May 1910 for her mother.

== Broadway cast ==
- Senator Constant Noyes ... George A. Schiller
- Jack ... Joseph M. Ratliff
- Dick .... Harry Fisher
- Harry ... Denman Maley
- Tom ... Fritz Williams
- Merri Murray ... Lotta Faust
- Rose Raglan ... Norma Brown
- Claire Voyant ... Linden Beckwith
- Pansy Burns ... George Monroe
- Lily Burns ... Lillian Lee
- A. Case Daly ... Taylor Holmes
- Souseberry Lushmore ... Vernon Castle
- Miss Beatrice Ballast ... Blanche Sherwood
- Lady Fire Fly ... Gladys Moore
- Mlle De Leon ... Maybelle Meeker
- The Cynical Owl ... Berchard Dickerson
- The Baby Owl ... Johnnie Hines
- Mercedes Panhard ... Nan J. Brennan
- Katherine Knockwell ... Florence Cable
- Mrs. Carrie Margin ... Blanche Ring

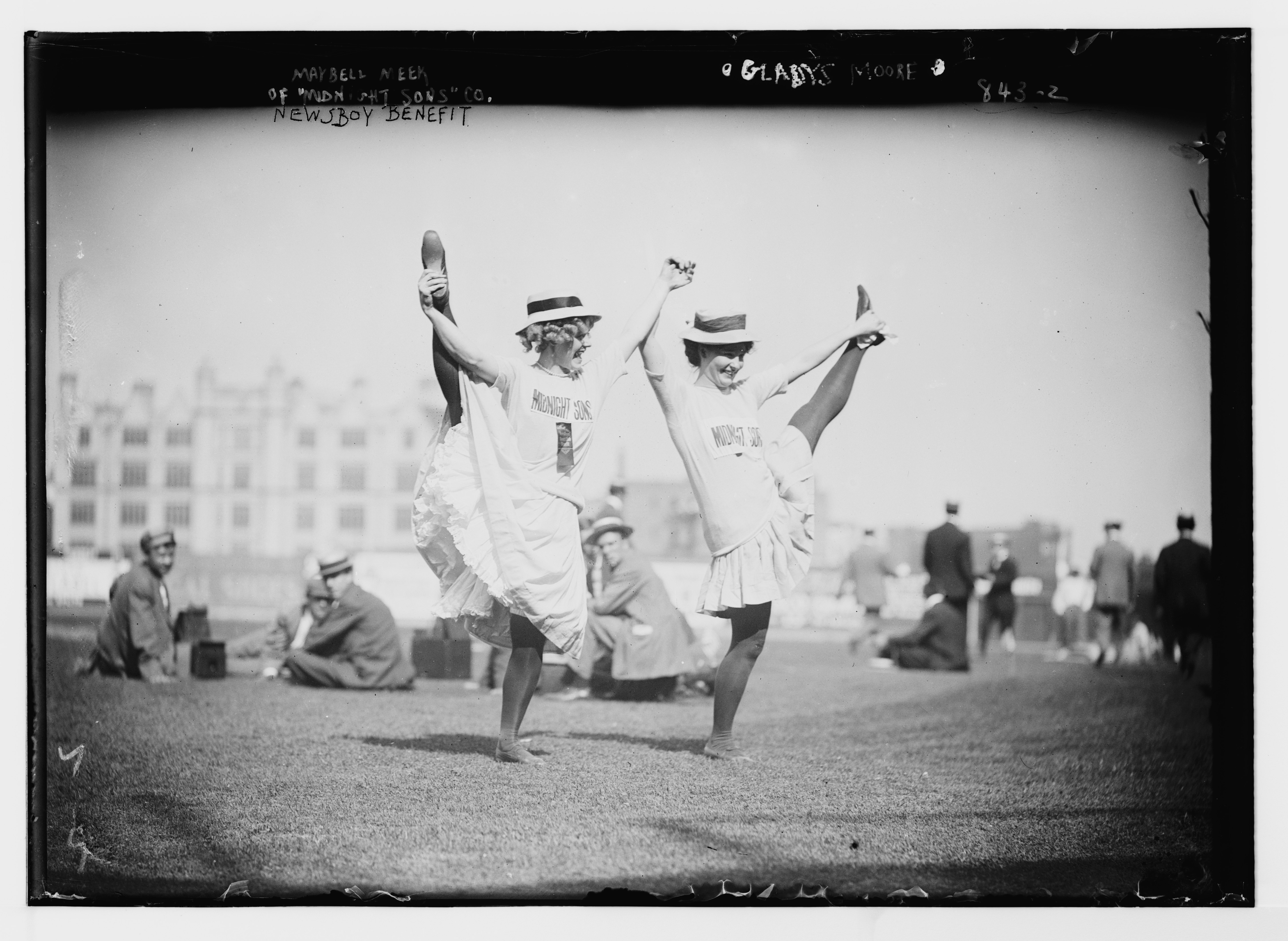
Meeker and Gladys Moore

== Other ==
F. Scott Fitzgerald references the musical in his 1928 short story "The Captured Shadow", describing a sheet music cover from the play with "three men in evening clothes and opera hats sauntering jovially along Broadway." One of these men would have been dancer Vernon Castle.
