= La Sylphe =

American dancer (1883–1968)

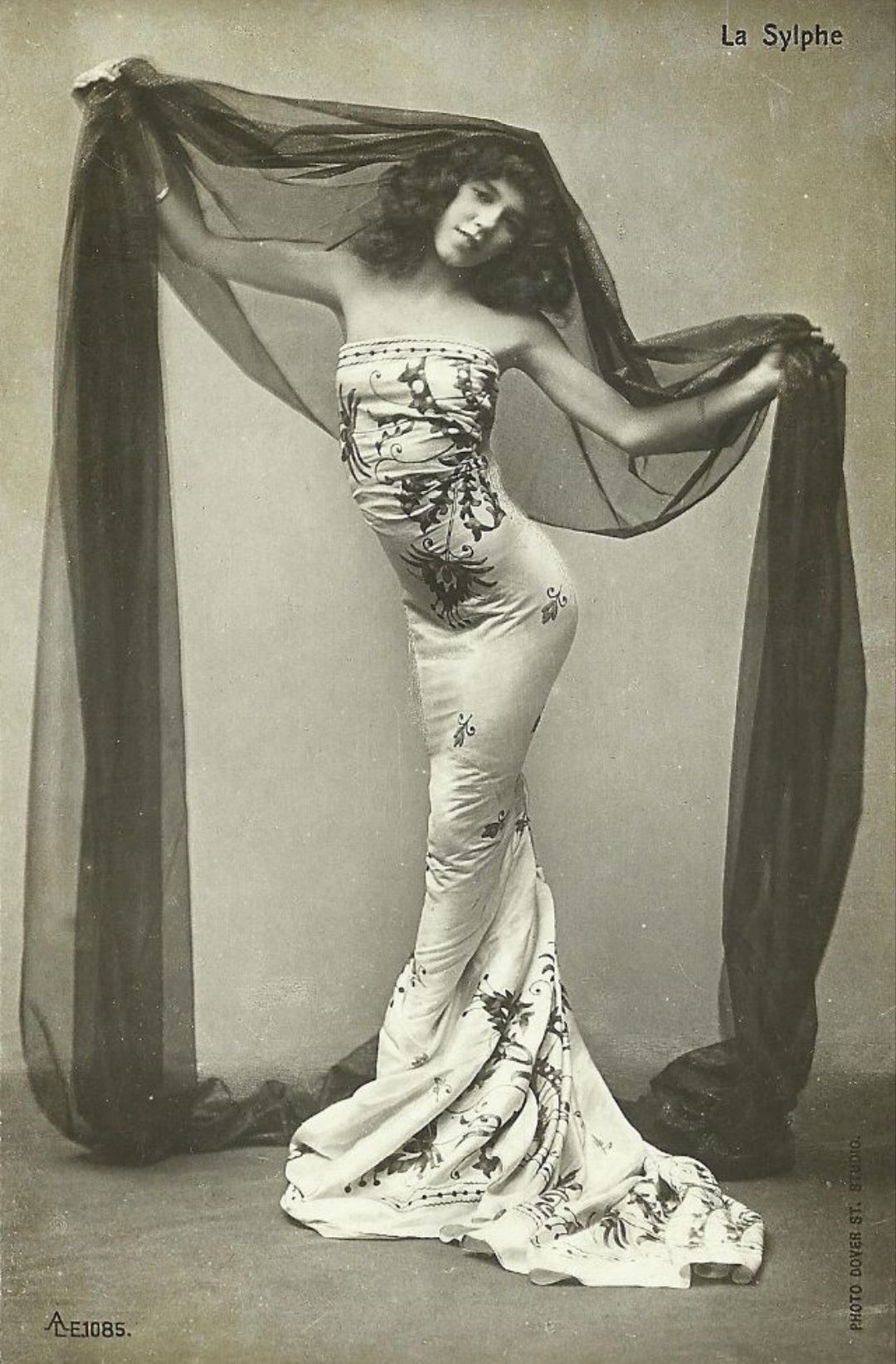
- Born: Edith Lambelle Langerfeld; July 3, 1883; New York, New York, U.S.
- Died: December 20, 1968 (aged 85); Greenwich, Connecticut, U.S.
- Other name: Edythe Lambelle
- Occupation: Dancer

Edith Lambelle Langerfeld (July 3, 1883 – December 20, 1968), known professionally as La Sylphe, was an American exotic dancer who became a sensation while performing at the Folies Bergère in the 1890s.

== Early life ==
Edith Lambelle Langerfeld was born on July 3, 1883, in New York City, the daughter of Arthur H. Langerfeld (1855–1931) and Margaret Ann Douglas Langerfeld (c. 1854–1943). Her father was German, born at Elberfeld in Nordrhein-Westfalen, now a part of Wuppertal, while her mother came from Loughgall, a small town in County Armagh, Northern Ireland. The Library of Congress has in their collection a photograph of Arthur Langerfeld with one of the machines he invented for use in the mining of coal. Edith had an older brother, Wallace Douglas Langerfeld, who was born on August 27, 1877.

Langerfeld was taken abroad by her mother at the age of six, when she began to dance. United States laws prevented her from performing on stage as a young girl. She traveled for eight years, making two trips around the world. Much of the time she spent in London, England, Milan, Italy, Paris, France and Brussels, Belgium. La Sylphe became fluent in five languages. She was the primary dancer at the Alhambra Theatre in London during her second world tour. This was among the most lucrative positions in the dancing world. Soon she appeared for two seasons at the Folies Bergère.

She made her debut in the United States at the age of 14, appearing first on the Pacific Coast. She danced in New York City beginning in 1899. There she introduced her rendition of The Vision of Salome dance.

== Vaudeville dancer ==
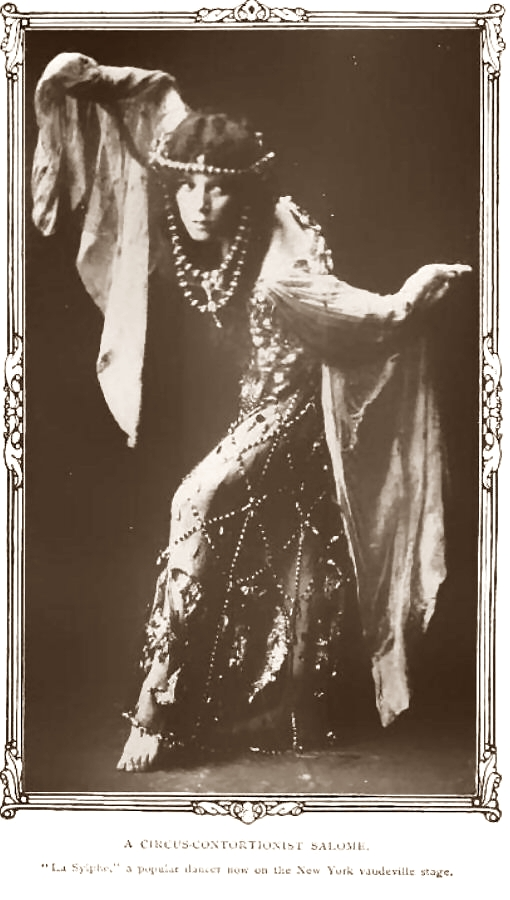
La Sylphe Salome Dance c. 1908

La Sylphe's popularity in the United States increased after Salome by Richard Strauss was banned by the Metropolitan Opera in 1907. She called her performances The Remorse of Salome. She understood the body dance of the Far East, which had been termed "the houchee kouchee" when it was first observed at the Chicago World's Fair in 1893. She was part of a vaudeville show at Koster & Bial's Music Hall in October 1899. She danced in a scene at a French ball included in a skit entitled Around New York In Eighty Minutes. A review described her as "a young woman who was seemingly made up of muscle but without bones, and who would make an ordinary contortionist turn green with envy at his talk of suppleness." Her mid-waist was covered only by several yards of pearls. On occasion she wore tights or a picketfence skirt and a gossamer bodice. She once complained about the bodice being too warm and threatened to leave it off in the next day's show. Although her appearances often provoked shock, La Sylphe confessed that her New York performances were tame in comparison to those she gave earlier in Europe. She performed as close a rendition of her "muscle dance" as she dared, given American conventions. However, she admitted that a more accurate interpretation of the Salome dance would have more closely followed the dances of the Orient.

La Sylphe signed with Martin Beck, general manager of the Orpheum Circuit, for a tour in 1908. She debuted in Oakland, California in March. She danced at Keith & Proctor's Harlem Opera House at 125th Street in Harlem under the watchful eye of a New York City police lieutenant and a squad of plainclothesmen, in July 1908. Her repertoire began with a pirouette called the dance classical. This was a classic toe dance. During her Parisian gigolette she appeared sans tights. While she readied for the Dance Salome, moving pictures of her performances were shown on a white screen. Men mostly remained in their seats at this time while females in the audience often made a rush for fresh air. James J. Corbett, giving a monologue, was also on the bill, as were Bedini and Arthur, who did a burlesque of La Sylphe. On July 20 La Sylphe altered her routine a bit. Instead of a toe dance she carried out a Spanish castanet dance in costume, which earned her an enthusiastic response from the audience. The following week she was at the Fifth Avenue Theatre. There she extended the length of her Salome dance, which was embellished by the addition of scenery. The head of John the Baptist was not featured in the new show. Instead, the stage included a desert scene depicting a monolith, in front of which incense was burning.

Joseph M. Gaites signed La Sylphe to tour with the Follies of 1907 for a period of thirty-five weeks at the end of July 1908. Returning to Keith & Proctor's in early August, she added a new dance called The Devil to her repertoire.

La Sylphe was in the cast of George White's Scandals of 1919. The show was a revue in two acts with eighteen scenes. White was among the players, as was dancer Ann Pennington. La Sylphe did an acrobatic dance for a summer evening in June. Scandals of 1920 was staged at the Globe Theatre (Lunt-Fontanne Theatre) and was a revue in two acts, with eighteen scenes. La Sylphe provided a contortionist routine in the first half of the show. Other noteworthy players were Pennington, White, Lou Holtz, and Lester Allen. Music for the summer 1920 presentation was by George Gershwin, with lyrics by Arthur Jackson. La Sylphe was also a part of the Greenwich Village Follies.

== Ballerina ==
She was a guest artist at Carnegie Hall in April 1928. The Dance Art Society, a cooperative producing organization, included thirty of its members in the featured ballet, entitled The Mills of the Gods. She danced in a diminutive harlequinade and a Beardsleyesque composition called The Faun and the Peacock. La Sylphe was the ballerina of the American Ballet Guild in 1930. At the same time Ariel Millais was ballet master.

== Death ==
Edith Lambelle Langerfeld died at the age of 85 on December 20, 1968, at Greenwich, Connecticut.
