= Eva Tanguay =

Canadian vaudeville singer and film actor (1878–1947)

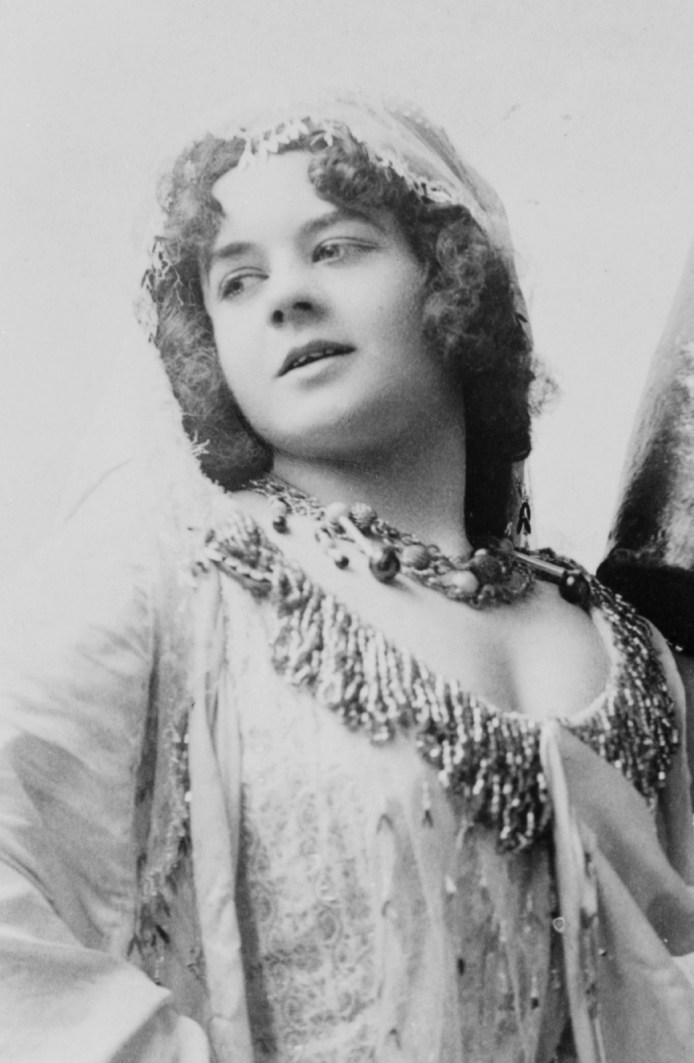
- Tanguay, c.1898
- Born: August 1, 1878; Marbleton, Quebec, Canada
- Died: January 11, 1947 (aged 68); Los Angeles, California, U.S.
- Occupations: Singer, entertainer
- Years active: 1888–1930s
- Spouse: Johnny Ford (m. 1913; div. 1917)

Eva Tanguay (August 1, 1878 – January 11, 1947) was a Canadian and American singer and entertainer who billed herself as "the girl who made vaudeville famous". She was known as "The Queen of Vaudeville" during the height of her popularity from the early 1900s until the early 1920s. Tanguay also appeared in films, and was the first performer to achieve mass-media celebrity in Canada and the US, with publicists and newspapers covering her tours from coast-to-coast, out-earning the likes of contemporaries Enrico Caruso and Harry Houdini. She was later described by Edward Bernays, "the father of public relations", as "our first symbol of emergence from the Victorian age."

== Early life ==
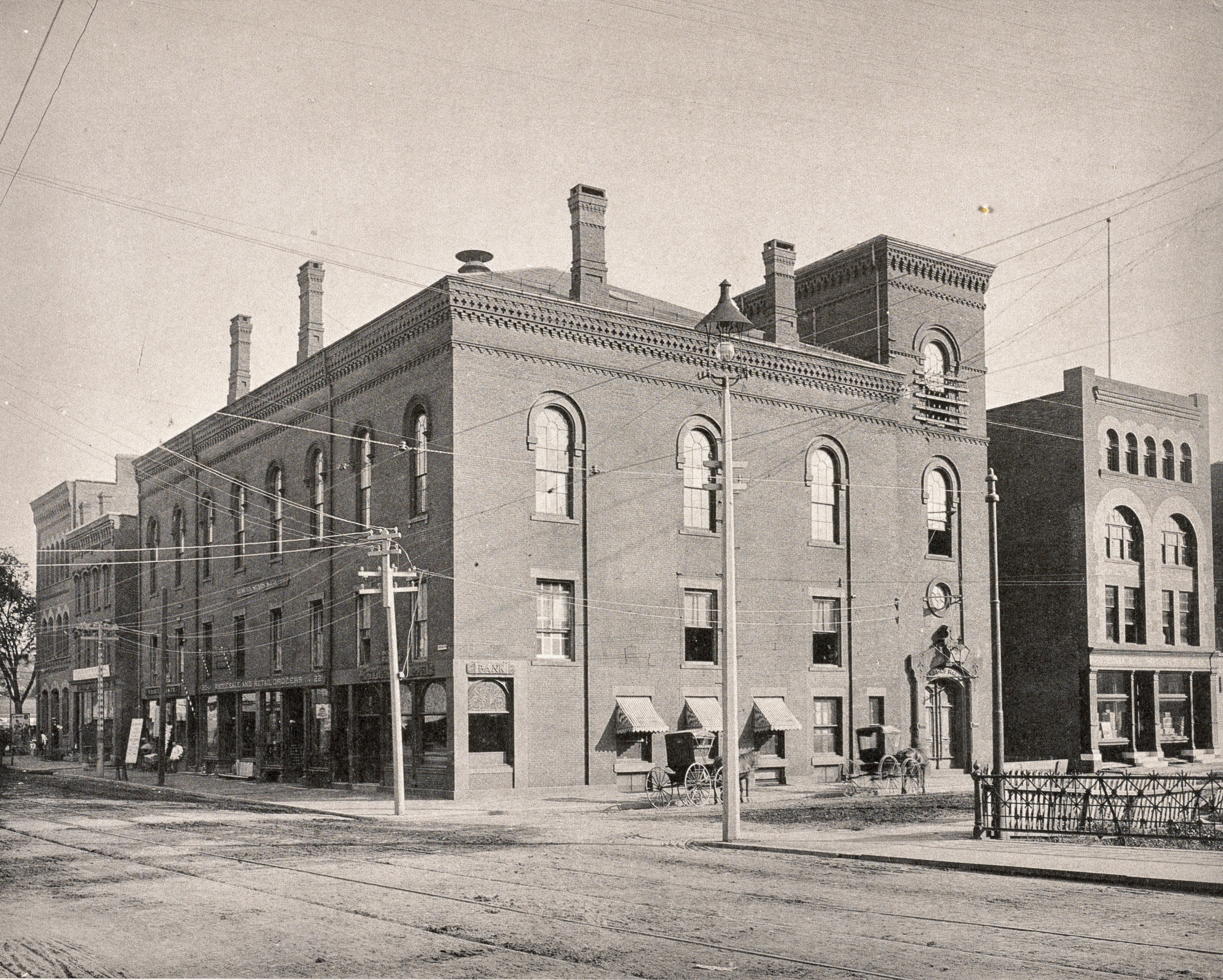
Holyoke's Parsons Hall, where Tanguay made her humble debut at amateur nights as a young girl, wearing several knit chair-throws and the fabric of an old umbrella as her dress

Tanguay was born in 1878 in Marbleton, Quebec. Her father was a doctor. Before she reached the age of six, her family moved from Quebec's Eastern Townships to Holyoke, Massachusetts. Her father died soon after. While still a child she developed an interest in the performing arts, making her first appearance on stage at the age of eight, circa 1886, at an amateur night in Holyoke. In her earliest days she was promoted through a small theater company operated by one Paul C. Winkelmann, a successful 16-year-old multi-instrumentalist who lived next door to her family and who used his influence to give a testimonial benefit show for her at the Holyoke Opera House, a venue which she would return to years later after establishing her own act.

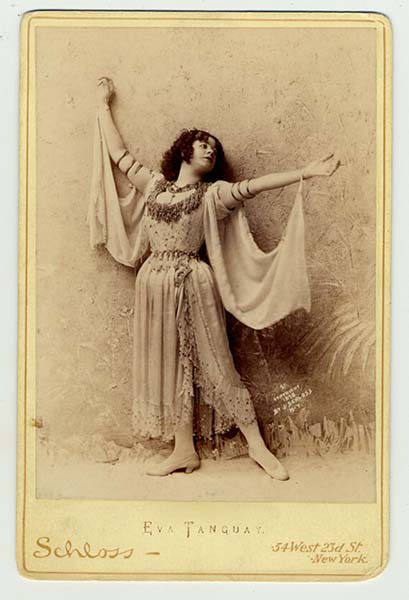

Two years later, she was touring professionally with a production of a stage adaptation of the popular Frances Hodgson Burnett novel Little Lord Fauntleroy. Tanguay eventually landed a spot in the Broadway musical My Lady in 1901. The 1904 show The Chaperons started her rise in popularity. In 1904 and 1905, her career reached new heights as she starred in The Sambo Girl, which debuted the song "I Don't Care," composed specifically for her.

The Sambo Girl also starred Melville Collins as Raphael Rubens, Tanguay's romantic interest in the show. This began a longterm professional partnership between Tanguay and Collins, with Collins serving as her accompanist in vaudeville for more than a decade and also her sometimes manager. He was reportedly the major love of Tanguay's life, although he never returned her feelings and ultimately married Tanguay's niece, Lillian M Skelding, in 1914. While Collins died in 1924, years later an urn containing his ashes was placed in Tanguay's casket and they were buried together in 1947.

== Stage career ==
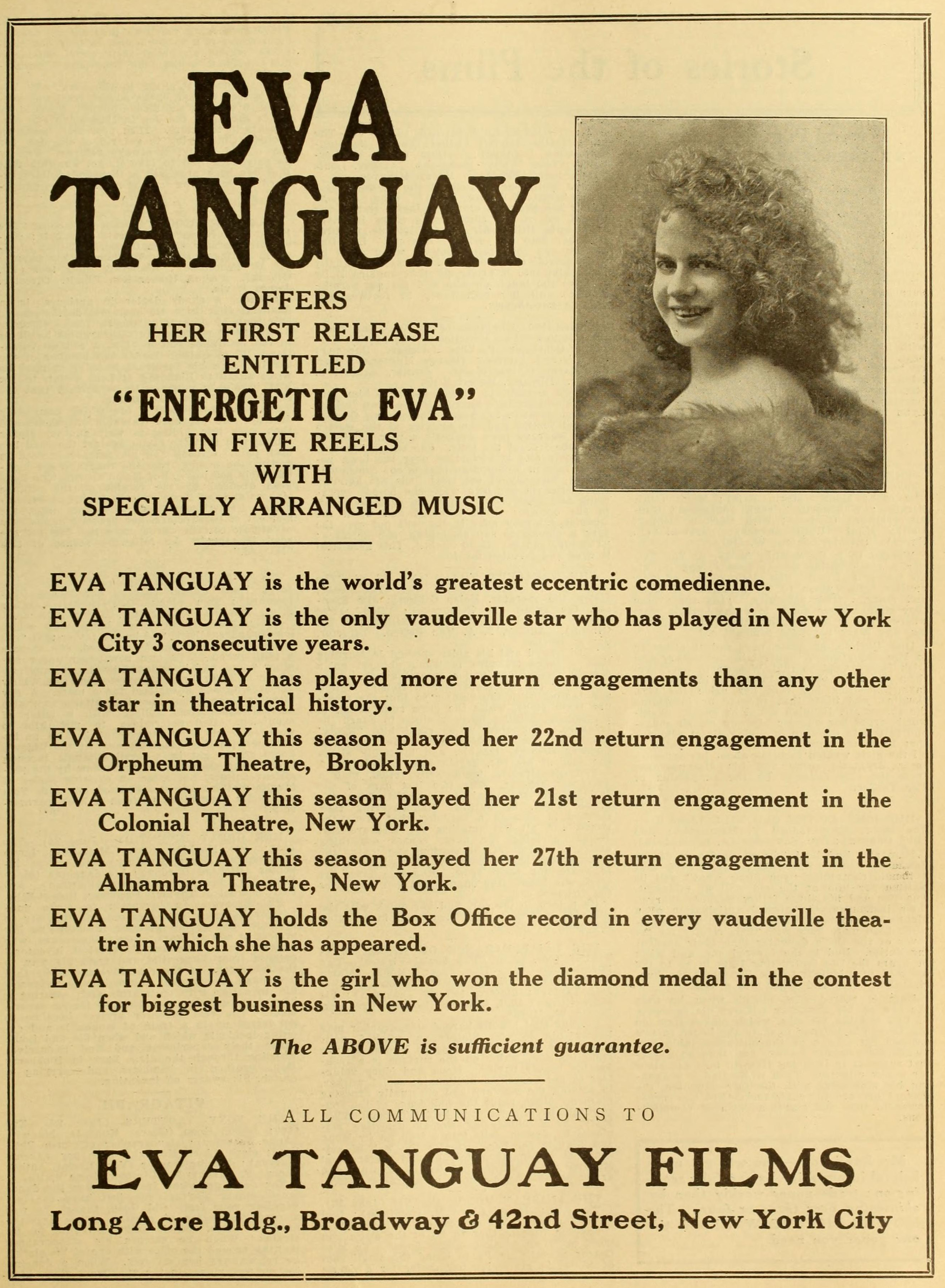
Advertisement (1916)

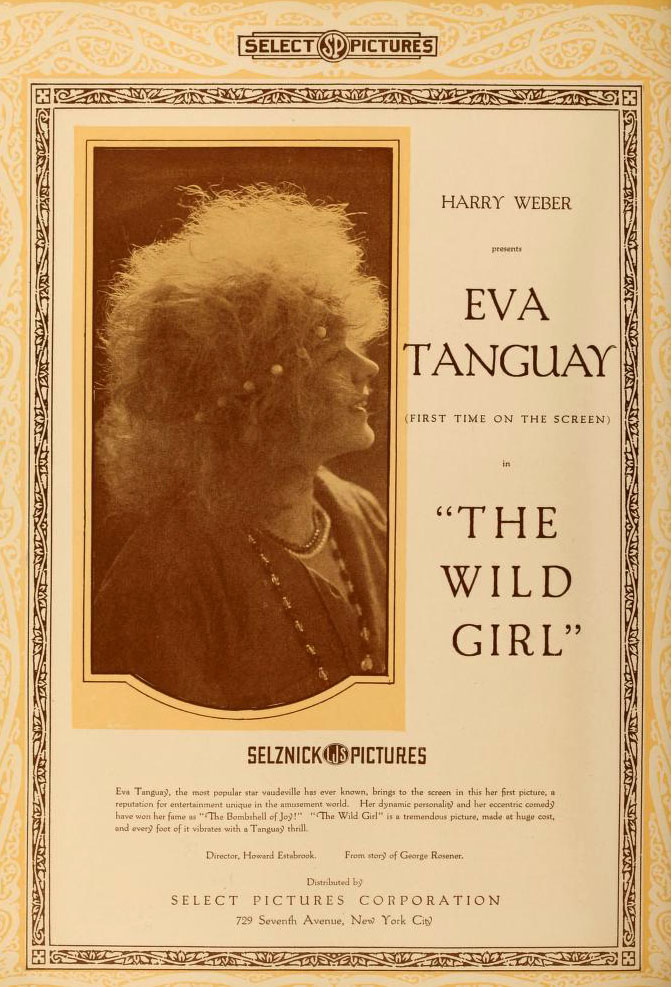
The Wild Girl (1917)

Although she possessed only an average voice, the enthusiasm with which Tanguay performed her suggestive songs soon made her an audience favorite. She went on to have a long-lasting vaudeville career and eventually commanded one of the highest salaries of any performer of the day, earning as much as $3,500 a week ($120,937 in 2025 dollars) at the height of her fame around 1910.

After seeing her perform, English poet and sexual revolutionary Aleister Crowley called Tanguay America's equivalent to Europe's music hall greats Marie Lloyd of England and Yvette Guilbert of France. The American Genius, he wrote, "is unlike all others. The 'cultured' artist, in this country, is always a mediocrity ... The true American is, above all things, FREE; with all the advantages and disadvantages that that implies. His genius is a soul lonely, disolate, reaching to perfection in some unguessed direction ... Eva Tanguay is the perfect American artist. She is ... starry chaste in her colossal corruption."

Tanguay is remembered for brassy, self-confident songs that symbolized the emancipated woman, such as "It's All Been Done Before but Not the Way I Do It", "I Want Someone to Go Wild with Me", "Go as Far as You Like", and "That's Why They Call Me Tabasco". In showbiz circles, she was nicknamed the "I Don't Care Girl" after her most famous song, "I Don't Care". She was brought in to star in the 1909 Ziegfeld Follies, where she replaced the husband-and-wife team of Jack Norworth and Nora Bayes, who were engaged in a bitter salary and personal feud with Ziegfeld. Tanguay requested that the musical number "Moving Day in Jungle Town" be taken from rising talent Sophie Tucker and given to her. Despite this, the two later became close friends.

Tanguay spent lavishly on publicity campaigns and costumes. One obituary notes that a "clever manager" told Tanguay early in her career that money made money. She never forgot the lesson, buying huge ads at her own expense and on one occasion allegedly spending twice her salary on publicity.

Gaining free publicity with outrageous behavior was one of her strengths. In 1907, she stayed with married entertainment journalist and publicist C. F. Zittel in a Brooklyn hotel for nearly a week. Zittel's wife uncovered the affair by hiring detectives dressed as room-service bellhops to burst into the room. The event made headlines and did not damage Eva's popularity, reputation, or box-office success. She also got her name in the papers for allegedly being kidnapped, allegedly having her jewels stolen, and being fined $50 in Louisville, Kentucky, for throwing a stagehand down a flight of stairs.

=== Stage costume ===
Her costumes were as extravagant as her personality. In 1910, a year after the Lincoln penny was first issued, Tanguay appeared on stage in a coat entirely covered in the new coins.

=== Recording ===
Tanguay only made one known recording ("I Don't Care") in 1922 for Nordskog Records. In addition to her singing career, she starred in two film comedies, which used the screen to capture her lusty stage vitality. The first, titled Energetic Eva, was made in 1916. The following year, she starred with Tom Moore in The Wild Girl.

=== Retirement ===
Tanguay was said to have lost more than $2 million ($37.5 million in 2025 dollars) in the Wall Street crash of 1929. In the 1930s, she retired from show business. Cataracts caused her to lose her sight, but Sophie Tucker, a friend from vaudeville days, paid for an operation that helped to restore some of her vision.

== Autobiography ==
At the time of her death, Tanguay was working on her autobiography, to be titled Up and Down the Ladder. Three excerpts from the autobiography were published in Hearst newspapers in 1946 and 1947.

== Death ==
Tanguay died on January 11, 1947, aged 68, in Hollywood. She was interred in the Hollywood Memorial Park Cemetery, now Hollywood Forever Cemetery.

== Legacy ==
In 1953, Mitzi Gaynor portrayed Eva Tanguay in a fictionalized version of her life in The I Don't Care Girl.

== Family ==
Tanguay married twice, although she was incorrectly reported to have been married up to four times, due in part to her 1908 public engagement to extremely popular cross-dressing performer Julian Eltinge, who played the bride while she dressed in traditional male formal attire. They exchanged rings but never legally wed.

Her first marriage was to dancer John Ford in 1913, but they divorced after four years. Following her divorce, Tanguay was romantically linked, though never married, as was sometimes reported, to vaudeville dancer Roscoe Ails. She terminated the relationship after Ails's behavior became increasingly erratic and violent.

In 1927, aged 49, Tanguay married her piano accompanist, 25-year-old Al Parado. Shortly after the marriage, she had it annulled on the grounds of fraud. She claimed that Parado had at least two other names, which he used so frequently that she was not sure which one was real. The marriage was actually a publicity ploy and was dissolved by Tanguay when it did not bear the intended promotional results.

== See also ==
- Blanche Merrill

== Literature ==
- Andrew L. Erdman: Queen of Vaudeville: the story of Eva Tanguay, Ithaca, NY: Cornell Univ. Press, 2012, ISBN 978-0-8014-4970-3
