= Four eleven forty-four =

Recurring phrase in popular music

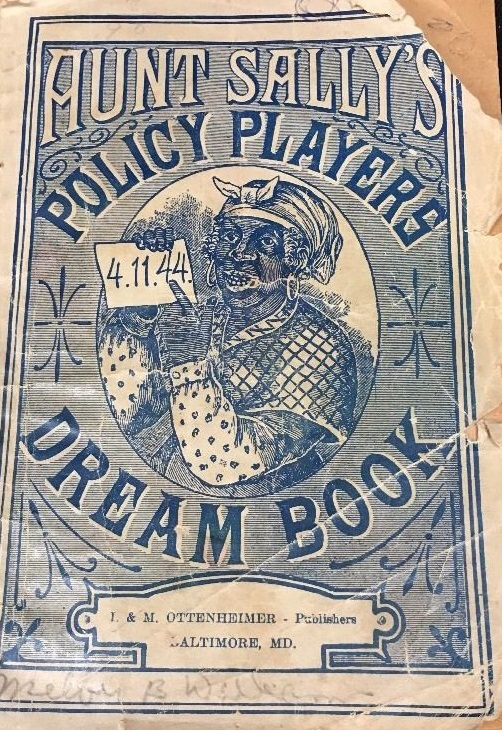
Aunt Sally's Policy Players Dream Book (1889)

"Four eleven forty-four", or "'4-11-44"' is a phrase that has been used repeatedly in popular music and as a reference to numbers allegedly chosen by poor African Americans for the purpose of gambling on lotteries. It was a well-known phrase in the 19th and early 20th centuries in the United States.

== History of usage ==
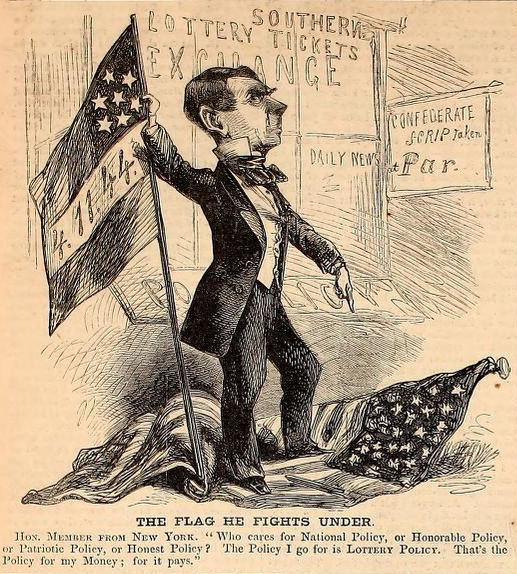
Newspaper editor Benjamin Wood portrayed in the August 31, 1861 issue of Harper's Weekly, flying a Confederate flag with 4-11-44 on it; Wood owned a lottery.

The roots of the phrase can be traced to the illegal lottery known as "policy" in the nineteenth-century U.S. Numbers were drawn on a wheel of fortune, ranging from 1 to 78. A three-number entry was known as a "gig", and a bet on 4, 11, and 44 was popular by the time of the Civil War.

The New York Clipper, a sporting and theatrical weekly, ran a serial story by John Cooper Vail in April and May 1862 entitled "'4-11-44!' or The Lottery of Life in the Great City," indicating that the number was already common in gambling. The Secrets of the Great City, an 1869 book by Edward Winslow Martin, referred to 4-11-44 and attributed the section on policy to "the New York correspondent of a provincial journal", but did not name the writer or give the date of the article, saying only that it had been published "recently".

The combination became known as the "washerwoman's gig" which was featured on the cover of Aunt Sally's Policy Players' Dream Book, published by H. J. Wehman of New York in the 1880s. The stereotypical player of the washerwoman's gig was a poor black male.

Jacob A. Riis wrote in How the Other Half Lives: Studies Among the Tenements of New York (1890) that

Of all the temptations that beset him, the one that troubles him and the police most is his passion for gambling. The game of policy is a kind of unlawful penny lottery specially adapted to his means, but patronized extensively by poor white players as well. It is the meanest of swindles, but reaps for its backers rich fortunes wherever colored people congregate. Between the fortune-teller and the policy shop, closely allied frauds always, the wages of many a hard day's work are wasted by the negro; but the loss causes him few regrets. Penniless, but with undaunted faith in his ultimate "luck," he looks forward to the time when he shall once more be able to take a hand at "beating policy." When periodically the negro's lucky numbers, 4-11-44, come out on the slips of the alleged daily drawings, that are supposed to be held in some far-off Western town, intense excitement reigns in Thompson Street and along the Avenue, where someone is always the winner. An immense impetus is given then to the bogus business that has no existence outside of the cigar stores and candy shops where it hides from the law, save in some cunning Bowery "broker's" back office, where the slips are printed and the "winnings" apportioned daily with due regard to the backer's interests.

A song entitled "4-11-44" appeared in The Major, a theatrical musical by Edward Harrigan and David Braham. "Four eleven forty-four" was listed in a songbook by H. J. Wehman in 1889. The published song was possibly as performed in an unsuccessful musical show, 4-11-44, by Bert Williams and George Walker, but few details have survived, and this has not been verified. Bob Cole published a song entitled "4-11-44: A Coon Ditty" in 1897 and performed it with the Black Patti Troubadour Company in the musical skit "At Jolly Cooney Island" around the same time.

Charles Fey, inventor of the slot machine, called his second machine which he created in 1895 the "4-11-44".

=== 20th century ===
The phrase "4-11-44" appeared in the coon song "Every Race Has a Flag but the Coon", by Will A. Heelan and J. Fred Helf, in 1900. The phrase appeared in 1909 in the newspaper comic "Little Nemo in Slumberland", by Winsor McCay, in which the numbers 4, 11 and 44 were shown on a sign hanging from the tail of an imaginary creature.

In 1912, The New York Times anticipated superstition surrounding the date April 11, 1944:

The 4-11-44 that may then be written will of course bring out into the letter writing industry every soul that ever hugged a rabbit's foot, or threw a horseshoe over the left shoulder, or a trembled when he broke a mirror or walked under a ladder.

— The New York Times

The phrase "4-11-44" was used in many later blues and jazz recordings. In 1925 the phrase was used in "The Penitentiary Bound Blues", by Rosa Henderson and the Choo-Choo Jazzers. Papa Charlie Jackson recorded a blues song entitled "4-11-44" in 1926. Pinetop & Lindberg released a different song with the same title in the 1930s.

A jazz composition of the same name was composed and recorded in 1963 by the New Orleans saxophone player Pony Poindexter on his album Gumbo, featuring Booker Ervin and Al Grey, released by Prestige Records. In 1981, R&B outfit Pieces of a Dream had a hit about lottery numbers with the possibly related "Fo-Fi-Fo" (4–5–4). Liverpudlian Pete Wylie released his original song "FourElevenFortyFour" on his 1987 album Sinful. The California band the Blasters recorded their "4-11-44" for the 2005 album of the same title. The musician Jawbone (Bob Zabor) released a track entitled "4-11-44" in 2005.

The Three Stooges short feature "So Long Mr. Chumps" (1941) centers on a convict, No. 41144, whom the Stooges try to break out of prison.
