= 1902 in music =

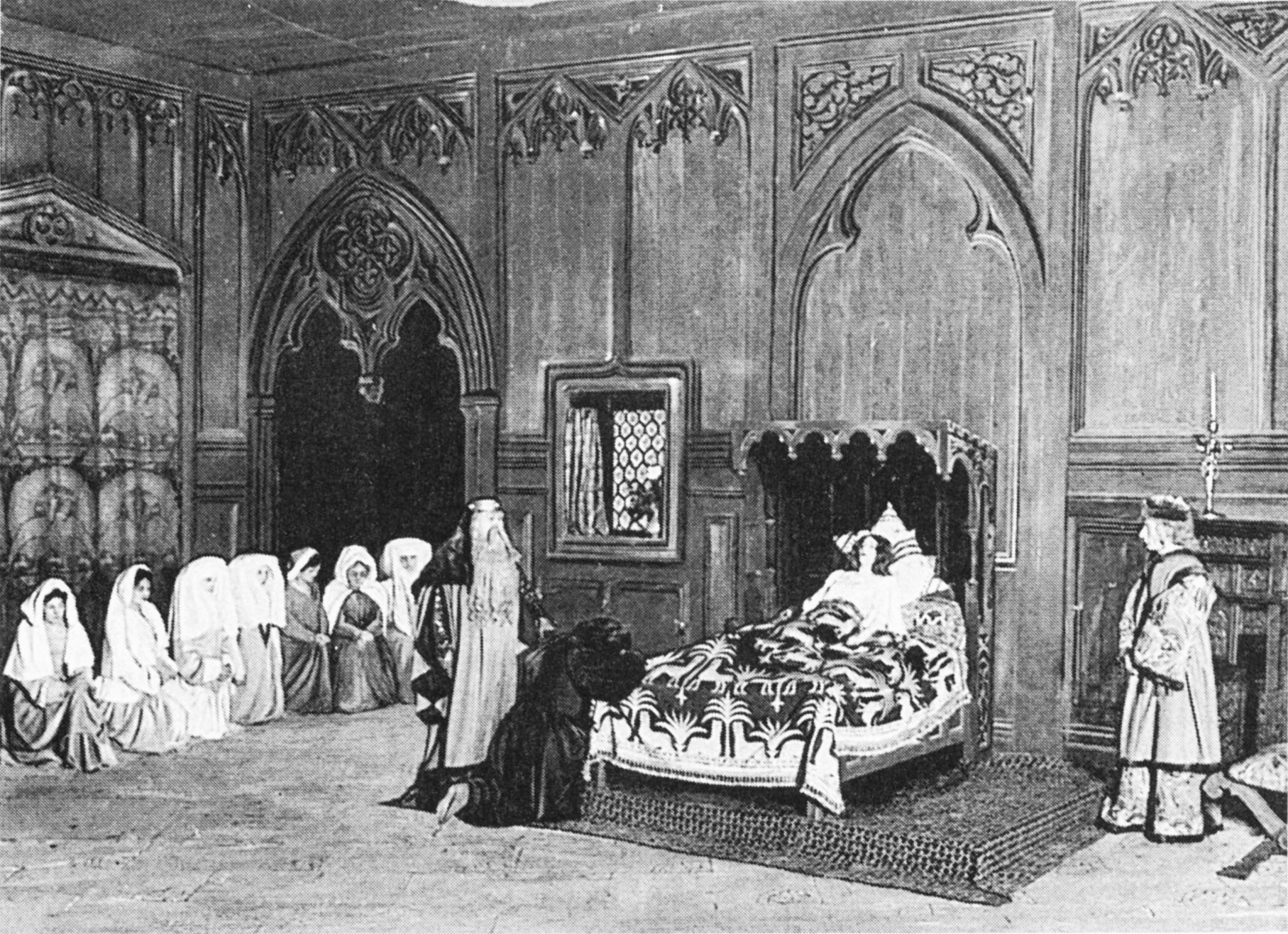
Original 1902 production of Pelléas et Mélisande; Mary Garden as Mélisande.

This is a list of notable events in music that took place in 1902.

== Specific locations ==
- 1902 in Norwegian music

== Events ==
- January 25
  - Franz Schmidt's Symphony No. 1 in E Major premieres in Vienna
  - Alexander Scriabin's Symphony No. 2 in C Minor premieres with Anatoly Liadov conducting at the Russian Symphony Concerts in Saint Petersburg
- February 18 – Jules Massenet's Le jongleur de Notre-Dame premieres at the Casino Monte Carlo
- March 1 – Sergei Vassilenko's cantata Skazaniye o grade velikom Kitezhe i tikhom ozere Svetoyare (Tale of the Great City of Kitezh and the Quiet Lake Svetoyar) receives its first performance in Moscow
- March 8 – Jean Sibelius conducts the world première of his Symphony No. 2 in Helsinki
- March 9 – Austrian composer Gustav Mahler (41) marries his student Alma Schindler (23)
- March 10 – Ralph Vaughan Williams' four-movement orchestral Bucolic Suite premieres in Bournemouth, England
- March 18 – Arnold Schoenberg's string sextet Verklärte Nacht receives its world premiere in Vienna, by the Rose String Quartet with two players from the Vienna Philharmonic
- April 5 – Maurice Ravel's Jeux d'eau is premiered by pianist Ricardo Vines at the Societe Nationale de Musique in Paris
- April 9 – One-act opera by Ethel Smyth Der Wald to her own libretto premieres in Berlin
- April 11
  - Tenor Enrico Caruso makes the first million-selling recording, of "Vesti la giubba", for the Gramophone Company in Milan
  - Cambridge University bestows the honorary degree of Doctor of Music upon American composer Horatio Parker
- April 12 – The zarzuela Los amores de la Inés by Manuel de Falla and Amadeo Vives to a libretto by Emilio Dugi premieres at the Teatro Comico in Madrid
- April 18 – The cantata The Celestial Country by Charles Ives receives its first performance at Central Presbyterian Church, New York City
- April 30 – Claude Debussy's only opera Pelléas et Mélisande is premiered at the Opéra-Comique in Paris, with André Messager conducting
- May 17 – Pianist and conductor Alfred Cortot, after studying the music of Richard Wagner at Bayreuth in 1898, conducts the French premiere of Götterdämmerung at the Theatre du Chateau d'Eau
- June 9 – The first complete performance of Gustav Mahler's Symphony No. 3 is given in Krefeld (the longest symphony in the standard repertoire – 90 minutes)
- June 26 – Composer Hubert Parry receives a baronetcy in the 1902 Coronation Honours; another, Charles Villiers Stanford, is knighted
- August 17 – Camille Saint-Saens's incidental music Parysatis premieres at the Grand Roman Arena in Béziers, France
- October 14 – Nikolai Rimsky-Korsakov's Servilia premieres at the Imperial Opera in Saint Petersburg
- November 26 – The opera Adriana Lecouvreur by Francesco Cilea premieres at the Teatro Lirico in Milan
- November 28 – Carl Nielsen's first opera Saul og David is produced in Copenhagen (Denmark)
- December 1 – Carl Nielsen conducts the premiėre of his Symphony No. 2, The Four Temperaments, in Copenhagen
- December 16 – Mikhail Ippolitov-Ivanov's Potemkin Holiday is produced in Saint Petersburg
- December 25 – Nikolai Rimsky-Korsakov Kashchei the Immortal premieres in Moscow
- Lead Belly begins performing.
- Walter Damrosch replaces Emil Paur as music director of the New York Philharmonic Society; his appointment lasts one season

== Published popular music ==
- "Any Rags?" w.m. Thomas S. Allen
- "Because" w. Edward Teschemacher m. Guy d'Hardelot
- "Bill Bailey Won't You Please Come Home" w.m. Hughie Cannon
- "Come Down Ma' Evenin' Star" w. Robert B. Smith m. John Stromberg
- "Could You Be True To Eyes Of Blue If You Looked Into Eyes Of Brown?" w.m. Will D. Cobb & Gus Edwards
- "Didn't Know Exactly What To Do" w. Frank Pixley m. Gustav Luders
- "Down On The Farm" w. Raymond A. Browne m. Harry Von Tilzer
- "Down The Line With Molly" w. George Totten Smith m. George L. Spaulding
- "Down Where The Wurzburger Flows" w. Vincent P. Bryan m. Harry Von Tilzer
- "The Entertainer" m. Scott Joplin
- "The Face In The Firelight" w.m. Charles Shackford

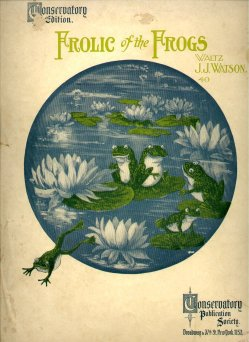
Frolic of the Frogs

- "The Gambling Man" w. William Jerome m. Jean Schwartz
- "The Glow Worm" w. Lilla Cayley Robinson (Ger) Heinz Bolten-Backers m. Paul Lincke
- "Happy Hooligan" m. Theodore Morse
- "Have You Seen My Sweetheart In His Uniform Of Blue?" w. Will D. Cobb m. Gus Edwards
- "Heidelberg Stein Song" w. Frank Pixley m. Gustav Luders
- "I Just Can't Help From Lovin' That Man" w. Andrew B. Sterling & Vincent P. Bryan m. Harry von Tilzer
- "I Sing A Little Tenor" w. Harry Linton m. John Gilroy
- "I Went To See Them March Away" w. S. E. Keisser m. R. J. Jose
- "I Wonder Why Bill Bailey Don't Come Home" w.m. Frank Fogerty, Matt C. Woodward & William Jerome
- "If Money Talks It Ain't On Speaking Terms With Me" w.m. J. Fred Helf
- "I'll Be There Mary Dear" w. Andrew B. Sterling m. Harry von Tilzer
- "I'll Be Waiting In The Gloaming, Sweet Genevieve" w.m. J. Fred Helf
- "I'll Be Your Rain-beau" w. Ed Gardinier m. J. Fred Helf
- "I'll Wed You In The Golden Summertime" w. Alfred Bryan m. Stanley Crawford
- "I'm The Man Who Makes The Money In The Mint" w.m. Will D. Cobb & Gus Edwards
- "I'm Unlucky" w. William Jerome m. Jean Schwartz
- "I've Been Sleeping On The Floor All Night" w.m. T.W. Connor
- "In Dear Old Illinois" by Paul Dresser
- "In Silence" w. Sydney Rosenfeld m. A. Baldwin Sloane
- "In The City Of Sighs And Tears" w. Andrew B. Sterling m. Kerry Mills
- "In The Good Old Summer Time" w. Ren Shields m. George Evans. Introduced by Blanche Ring in the musical The Defender.
- "In The Sweet Bye And Bye" w. Vincent P. Bryan m. Harry Von Tilzer
- "In The Valley Of Kentucky" w.m. Tony Stanford
- "It's A Nice Little Cosy Kitchen" w.m. T.W. Connor
- "It's Got To Be A Minstrel Show Tonight" w. Ren Shields m. George Evans
- "Jennie Lee" w. Arthur J. Lamb m. Harry Von Tilzer
- "Just Can't Help From Lovin' That Man" w. Andrew B. Sterling & Vincent P. Bryan m. Harry von Tilzer
- "Just For Tonight" w.m. Frank O. French
- "Just Next Door" w.m. Charles K. Harris
- "Kashmiri Song" w. Laurence Hope (Adela Florence Nicolson) 1901 m. Amy Woodforde-Finden
- "Katrina" w.m. Edward W. Corliss
- "Land Of Hope And Glory" w. Arthur C. Benson m. Edward Elgar
- "The Leader Of The Frocks And Frills" w. Robert H. Smith m. Melville Ellis
- "Less Than The Dust" w. Laurence Hope m. Amy Woodforde-Finden
- "Levee Rag" m. Charles Mullen
- "The Mansion of Aching Hearts" w. Arthur J. Lamb m. Harry Von Tilzer
- "May Sweet May" w. R. J. Jose m. Robert S. Roberts
- "The Meaning Of USA" w.m. Raymond A. Browne
- "Meet Me When The Sun Goes Down" w. Vincent P. Bryan m. Harry von Tilzer
- "The Message Of The Rose" w. Will A. Heelan m. Leo Edwards
- "The Message Of The Violet" w. Frank Pixley m. Gustav Luders
- "Mister Dooley" w. William Jerome m. Jean Schwartz
- "My Sulu Lulu Loo" w. George Ade m. Nat D. Mann
- "Nobody's Looking But The Owl And The Moon" w. Bob Cole & James Weldon Johnson m. J. Rosamond Johnson
- "Nursery Rhymes" w. William Jerome m. Jean Schwartz
- "Oh! Didn't He Ramble" w.m. Bob Cole & J. Rosamond Johnson
- "On A Sunday Afternoon" w. Andrew B. Sterling m. Harry Von Tilzer
- "On The Day King Edward Gets His Crown On" w.m. Mark Lorne & Harry Pleon
- "Paint Me A Picture Of Mama" w. Addison Burkhardt m. Raymond Hubbell
- "The Passing Of Rag-Time" m. Arthur Pryor
- "Pinky Panky Poo" w. Aaron S. Hoffman m. Andy Lewis
- "The Plan of Love" m. Annie P. Lumsden
- "Please Go 'Way And Let Me Sleep" w. Cecil Mack m. J. Tim Brymn
- "Pomp and Circumstance" by Edward Elgar
- "Pretty Little Dinah Jones" w.m. J. B. Mullen
- "R-E-M-O-R-S-E" w. George Ade m. Alfred G. Wathall
- "Rip Van Winkle Was A Lucky Man" w. William Jerome m. Jean Schwartz
- "Sal" w.m. Paul Rubens
- "Sammy" w. James O'Dea m. Edward Hutchinson
- "Since Sister Nell Heard Paderewski Play" w. William Jerome m. Jean Schwartz
- "Those Things Cannot Be Explained" w. Junie McCree m. Ben M. Jerome
- "The Troubles Of Reuben And The Maid" w. J. Cheever Goodwin m. Maurice Levi
- "Under The Bamboo Tree" w.m. Bob Cole & J. Rosamond Johnson
- "Under the Double Eagle" by Josef Franz Wagner
- "Wait At The Gate For Me" w. Ren Shields m. Theodore F. Morse
- "What's The Matter With The Moon Tonight?" w. Sydney Rosenfeld m. A. Baldwin Sloane
- "When Kate And I Were Comin' Thro' The Rye" w. Andrew B. Sterling m. Harry Von Tilzer
- "When The Fields Are White With Cotton" w. Robert F. Roden w. Max S. Witt
- "When The Troupe Gets Back To Town" w. George Totten Smith m. Harry von Tilzer
- "Where The Sunset Turns The Ocean's Blue To Gold" w. Eva Fern Buckner m. Henry W. Petrie

== Recorded popular music ==
- "Arkansaw Traveler" – Len Spencer
- "In the Good Old Summer Time" – William Redmond

== Classical music ==
- Granville Bantock – The Witch of Atlas
- Béla Bartók - Scherzo Burlesque for Piano and Orchestra, Op.2
- Georgy Catoire – Piano Trio in F minor, Op.14
- Edward Elgar – Dream Children, Op. 43
- Alexander Glazunov –
  - From the Middle Ages
  - Symphony No. 7, Op. 77 (Pastoral)
- Alfred Hill – Hinemoa
- Joseph Jongen – Piano Quartet, Op.23
- Scott Joplin
  - A Breeze from Alabama
  - Cleopha
  - Elite Syncopations
  - The Entertainer
  - I Am Thinking of My Pickanniny Days
  - March Majestic
  - The Ragtime Dance
  - The Strenuous Life
- Serge Koussevitzky – Double Bass Concerto
- Stephan Krehl – Quintet for Clarinet and Strings, Op.19
- Mykola Lysenko – 3 Pieces from 'Album from the Summer of 1902', Op.41
- Vítězslav Novák – In the Tatra Mountains
- Max Reger – 16 Gesänge, Op.62
- Camille Saint-Saëns - Cello concerto No.2 in D Minor for cello and orchestra
- Franz Schmidt - Symphony No. 1 in E major premiers in Vienna (January 25, 1902)
- Jean Sibelius – Symphony No. 2, Op. 43
- Leone Sinigaglia – Variations on a Theme by Brahms, Op.22
- Francisco Tárrega – Gran Vals
- Ralph Vaughan Williams – Blackmwore by the Stour

== Opera ==
- Francesco Cilea – Adriana Lecouvreur premiered on November 26 in Milan
- Claude Debussy – Pelléas et Mélisande premiered on April 30 in Paris
- Manuel de Falla – Los amores de la Inés
- Alberto Franchetti – Germania
- Edward German – Merrie England
- Reynaldo Hahn – La Carmélite
- Engelbert Humperdinck – Dornröschen, premiered on November 12 in Frankfurt am Main
- Mikhail Ippolitov-Ivanov – Potemkin Holiday
- Franz Lehár – Der Rastelbinder, premiered on December 20 in Vienna
- Jules Massenet – Le Jongleur de Notre Dame premiered on February 18 at the Theatre de Casino in Monte Carlo
- Carl August Nielsen – Saul and David premiered on November 29 in Copenhagen
- Emile Pessard – L'armée des vierges premiered on October 15 at the Bouffes-Parisiens, Salle Choiseul, Paris
- Nikolai Rimsky-Korsakov – Servilia premiered on October 14 in St.Petersburg
- Nikolai Rimsky-Korsakov – Kashchei the Immortal
- George Stephanescu – Petra
- Ethel Smyth – Der Wald premiered on April 9 in Berlin

== Ballet ==
- January 24 - Oskar Nedbal - Pohádka o Honzovi (The Tale of Honza) premieres at National theatre in Prague
- February 2 - Alexander Gorsky's revised version of Don Quixote opens in Moscow. Based on a staging of the ballet by Marius Petipa from 1871
- April 21 - In Japan is produced by the Alhambra Theater, London. Carlo Coppi choreographs music by Louis Ganne
- June 16 - Carlo Coppi's last piece of choreography for London Alhambra Ballet - Britannia's Realm premiers on the occasion of King Edward's VII's coronation

== Musical theater ==
Lillian Russell – Come Down Ma Evenin' Star
Lillian Russell's only recording, from 1912. During the production of Twirly Whirly (1902), composer John Stromberg delayed giving her her solo for several days, saying it wasn't ready. When he committed suicide a few days before the first rehearsal, the sheet music for "Come Down Ma Evenin' Star" was found in his pocket. It became Lillian Russell's signature song.

- Bob Herceg (Prince Bob) – by Jenö Huszka, with libretto by Ferenc Martos and Károly Bakonyi
- A Country Girl London production opened at Daly's Theatre on January 18 and ran for 729 performances
- The Defender (Music: Charles Dennée Book & Lyrics: Allen Lowe) Broadway production opened at the Herald Square Theatre on July 3 and ran for 60 performances. Starring Blanche Ring.
- The Emerald Isle Broadway production
- The Girl from Kays London production opened at the Apollo Theatre on November 15 and ran for 432 performances.
- Madame Sherry Berlin and Paris productions
- The Prince of Pilsen premieres at the Tremont Theatre in Boston on May 20, 1902
- The Rogers Brothers At Harvard Broadway production
- Three Little Maids London production opened at the Apollo Theatre on May 10 and transferred to the Prince of Wales Theatre on September 8 for a total run of 348 performances.
- Tommy Rot Broadway production
- The Toreador Broadway production
- Twirly-Whirly Broadway production
- The Wild Rose Broadway production opened at the Knickerbocker Theatre on May 5 and ran for 136 performances. Starring Eddie Foy, Albert Hart, Junie McCree, Irene Bentley, Marguerite Clark and Marie Cahill.

== Births ==
- January – Billy Pigg, Northumbrian piper (d. 1968)
- January 6 - Mark Brunswick, American composer (d.1971)
- January 9 - Rudolf Bing, Austrian operatic impresario (d.1997)
- January 11
  - Evelyn Dove, British singer (d. 1987)
  - Maurice Duruflé, French composer (d. 1986)
- January 21 – Webster Booth, English tenor (d. 1984)
- February 9 – Blanche Calloway, American jazz singer (d. 1978)
- February 26 – Rudolf Moralt, German conductor (d. 1958)
- February 27 - Marian Anderson, American contralto (d.1993)
- March 16 – Leon Roppolo, US jazz clarinetist (d. 1943)
- March 21 – Son House, blues musician (d. 1988)
- March 29
  - William Walton - British composer (d. 1983)
  - Mario Rossi - Italian conductor (d.1992)
- March 31 – Hans Albrecht, musicologist (died 1961)
- April 4 – Adam Adrio, German musicologist (d. 1973)
- April 8
  - Maria Maksakova Sr. - Soviet opera singer (d. 1974)
  - Josef Krips - Austrian conductor (d.1974)
- April 24 – Rube Bloom, US pianist and composer (d. 1976)
- April 26 – Walter Dana, polka-music promoter (d. 2000)
- May 1 – Sonnie Hale, English actor and singer (d. 1959)
- May 7 – Marcel Poot, Belgien composer (d. 1988)
- May 11 – Bidu Sayão, Brazilian opera singer (d. 1999)
- May 17
  - Werner Egk, German composer (d. 1983)
  - Max Lorenz, German tenor (d. 1975)
- May 18 – Meredith Willson, US composer (d. 1984)
- May 18 – Henri Sauguet, French composer (d. 1989)
- May 19 – Lubka Kolessa, pianist and music teacher (d. 1997)
- May 31 – Billy Mayerl, English pianist, composer and conductor (d. 1959)
- June 2 – Rosa Rio, American organist and composer (d. 2010)
- June 6 – Jimmie Lunceford, bandleader (d. 1947)
- June 13 - Oliviero De Fabritiis, Italian conductor and composer (d. 1982)
- June 15 - Max Rudolf, German conductor (d.1995)
- June 17
  - Vivian Duncan, singer, songwriter and actress, member of the Duncan Sisters (d. 1986)
  - Sammy Fain, US composer (d. 1989)
- June 19 – Guy Lombardo, bandleader (d. 1977)
- June 21 – Skip James, blues musician (d. 1969)
- June 26 - Hugues-Adhemar Cuenod, Swiss tenor (d.2010)
- July 7 – Karl Gustav Fellerer, musicologist (died 1984)
- July 19 – Buster Bailey, jazz clarinetist (d. 1967)
- July 20 – Jimmy Kennedy, Irish-born British songwriter (d. 1984)
- July 21 – Omer Simeon, jazz musician (d. 1959)
- August 6
  - Jim Davidson, Australian bandleader (d. 1982)
  - Margarete Klose, German contralto (d. 1968)
- August 9
  - Zino Francescatti, violinist (d. 1991)
  - Solomon Cutner, English pianist (d. 1988)
- August 25 – Stefan Wolpe, German composer (d. 1972)
- September 14 – Giorgos Papasideris, Greek singer, composer, and lyricist (d. 1977)
- October 25 – Eddie Lang, US jazz guitarist (d. 1933)
- November 1 – Eugen Jochum, German conductor (d. 1987)
- November 22
  - Ethel Smith, organist (d. 1996)
  - Emanuel Feuermann, Austrian cellist (d. 1942)
  - Joaquin Rodrigo, Spanish composer (d. 1999)
- December 11 – Alfred Rosé, composer (died 1975)
- December 15 – Mary Skeaping, British choreographer (d. 1984)
- December 19 – Dusolina Giannini, Italian-American soprano (d. 1986)
- December 27 – Sam Coslow, US songwriter and singer (d. 1982)

== Deaths ==
- January 7 – Wilhelm Hertz, lyricist (born 1835)
- January 14 – Richard M. Walters, piano and organ manufacturer
- January 17 – Elias Blix, politician, poet and musician (b. 1836)
- January 11 – James James, composer of the Welsh national anthem, "Hen Wlad fy Nhadau" (b. 1833)
- January 18 – Filippo Marchetti, opera composer
- January 20 – Camilla Urso, violinist (b. 1842)
- February 1 – Salomon Jadassohn, composer and music teacher (b. 1831)
- February 9 – Ludwig von Brenner, conductor and composer (b. 1833)
- February 11 – Leonid Malashkin, conductor and composer (b. 1842)
- April 21 – Ethna Carbery, songwriter (b. 1866)
- June 17 – Karl Piutti, organist and composer (b. 1846)
- June 20 – Caspar Joseph Brambach (b. 1833)
- July 5 – John Stromberg, composer (b. 1858)
- July 6 – Leopoldo Miguez, composer (b. 1850)
- July 13 – Benjamin Bilse, conductor and composer (b. 1816)
- August 3 – August Klughardt, conductor and composer (b. 1847)
- August 11 – Charles E. Pratt, composer (born 1841)
- August 23 - Teresa Stolz, Czech soprano (b. 1834)
- September 7
  - Enrique Gaspar y Rimbau, zarzuela writer (b. 1842)
  - Franz Wüllner, German conductor and composer (b. 1832)
- September 11 – Émile Bernard, French composer and organist
- September 26 – Camille D'elmar, actress and opera singer (b. 1861)
- September 28 – Ion Ivanovici, bandleader and composer (b. 1845)
- October 24 – Vladyslav Zaremba, composer and pianist (b. 1833)
- December 4 – Fyodor Ignat'yevich Stravinsky, Russian bass (b. 1843)
- date unknown
  - Güllü Agop, Turkish theatre director
  - Jones Hewson, operatic baritone (b. 1874)
  - Franz Nachbaur, opera singer (b. 1835)
  - Ramon Delgado Palacios, Venezuelan pianist and composer
  - Cyrille Rose, clarinetist and teacher (b. 1830)
