= Coon song =

Genre of music that presented a stereotype of African Americans

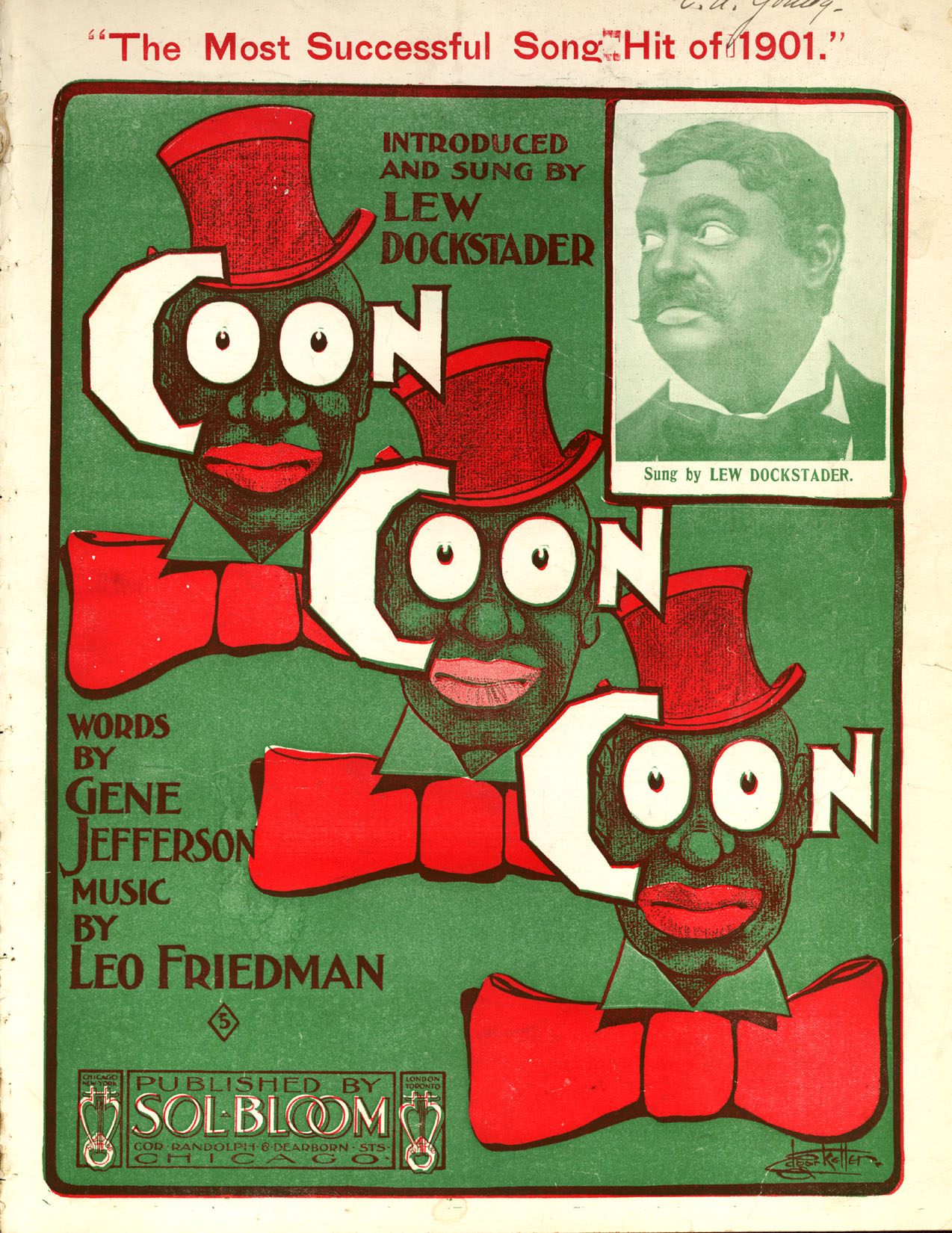
- Sheet music for "Coon, Coon, Coon", which bills itself as "The Most Successful Song Hit of 1901" with insert photo of minstrel show star Lew Dockstader in blackface
- Stylistic origins: Minstrel show
- Cultural origins: c. 1840s United States

Other topics
- Music hall

Coon songs or blackface songs were a genre of music that presented a stereotype of black people. They were popular in the United States and Australia from around 1880 to 1920, though the earliest such songs date from American minstrel shows as far back as 1848, when they were not yet identified with the "coon" epithet. The genre became extremely popular, with white and black men giving performances in blackface and making recordings. Women known as coon shouters also gained popularity in the genre.

== Rise and fall from popularity ==
Although the word "coon" is now regarded as a racial slur, according to Stuart Flexner, "coon" was short for "raccoon", and it meant a frontier rustic (someone who may wear a coonskin cap) by 1832. By 1840, it also meant a Whig, as the Whig Party was keen to be associated with rural white common people. The Whigs used a raccoon as its emblem, but the party also developed a more tolerant attitude towards black people than the other political factions. One suggestion is that this may have transformed the term "coon" from mere political slang into a racial slur.

At that time, "coon" was typically used to refer someone white, and a coon song referred to a Whig song. Although the word "coon" meaning "black person" was in use by 1837, it was only in 1848 that the first clear case of using "coon" to refer to a black person in a derogatory sense appeared. It is possible that the negative racial connotation of the word may have evolved from "Zip Coon" (a variant of "Turkey in the Straw") published around 1834 and notably performed by George Washington Dixon in blackface. as well as the common use of the word "coon" in blackface minstrel shows.

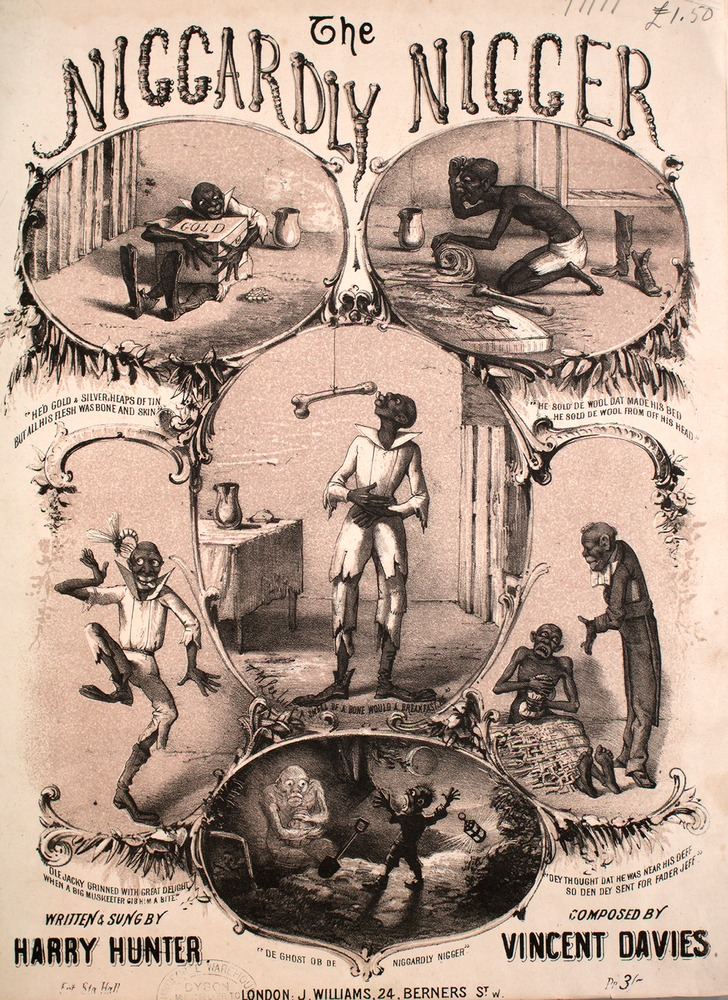
"The Niggardly Nigger", a British minstrel song from 1870.

British music hall performers also produced songs with stereotypical elements as early as the 1860s–1870s, often as part of minstrel-style acts. These were typically lighter comic pieces integrated into variety entertainment rather than the syncopated, "coon song" craze that developed in the United States and did not generally use the term ‘coon'. An example is "The Niggardly Nigger" (1870) by English music hall performer and songwriter Harry Hunter, which had a punning theme and was advertised and reviewed contemporaneously as a new comic song in minstrel troupe performances.

An alternative suggestion of the word's origin to mean a black person is that it was derived from barracoon, an enclosure for slaves, which became increasingly used in the years before the American Civil War as temporary enclosure for slaves escaping or traveling. It may also have been used earlier on the stage; a black man named Raccoon was one of the lead characters in a 1767 colonial comic opera The Disappointment.

Whatever the origin, by 1862, "coon" had come to mean a black person. The first explicitly coon-themed song, published in 1880, may have been "The Dandy Coon's Parade" by Joseph P. Skelly. Other notable early coon songs included "The Coons Are on Parade", "New Coon in Town" (by J. S. Putnam, 1883), "Coon Salvation Army" (by Sam Lucas, 1884), "Coon Schottische" (by William Dressler, 1884). The most popular coon songs of this early period, however, were written by whites, and only one, "New Coon in Town", has enough syncopation "to foreshadow the true, shouting, ragtime school". Black Americans had also entered the music business by this time, and their syncopated music then came to be identified with real coon songs.

By the mid-1880s, coon songs were a national craze; over 600 such songs were published in the 1890s. The most successful songs sold millions of copies. To take advantage of the fad, composers "add[ed] words typical of coon songs to previously published songs and rags". The first hit recorded song by a black man was "The Whistling Coon" by George W. Johnson recorded in 1890. After the turn of the century, coon songs began to receive criticism for their racist content. In 1905, Bob Cole, an African-American composer who had gained fame largely by writing coon songs, made somewhat unprecedented remarks about the genre. When asked in an interview about the name of his earlier comedy A Trip to Coontown, he replied: "That day has passed with the softly flowing tide of revelations."

In 1908, the Broadway company Cinemaphone, created by J. A. Whitman, released a short film, Coon Song, which had an audible track featuring singers such as Blanche Ring, Anna Held, Eva Tanguay and Stella Mayhew. Following further criticism, the use of "coon" in song titles greatly decreased after 1910. On August 13, 1920, Marcus Garvey's Universal Negro Improvement Association and African Communities League created the red, black and green flag as a response to the song "Every Race Has a Flag but the Coon" by Will A. Heelan and J. Fred Helf. That song along with "Coon, Coon, Coon" and "All Coons Look Alike to Me" were identified by H. L. Mencken as being the three songs which firmly established the derogatory term "coon" in the American vocabulary.

It is possible that the popularity of coon songs may be explained in part by their historical timing: coon songs arose precisely as the popular music business exploded in Tin Pan Alley. However, James Dormon, a former professor of history and American studies at the University of Southwestern Louisiana, has also suggested that coon songs can be seen as "a necessary sociopsychological mechanism for justifying segregation and subordination." The songs portrayed black people as posing a threat to the American social order and implied that they had to be controlled.

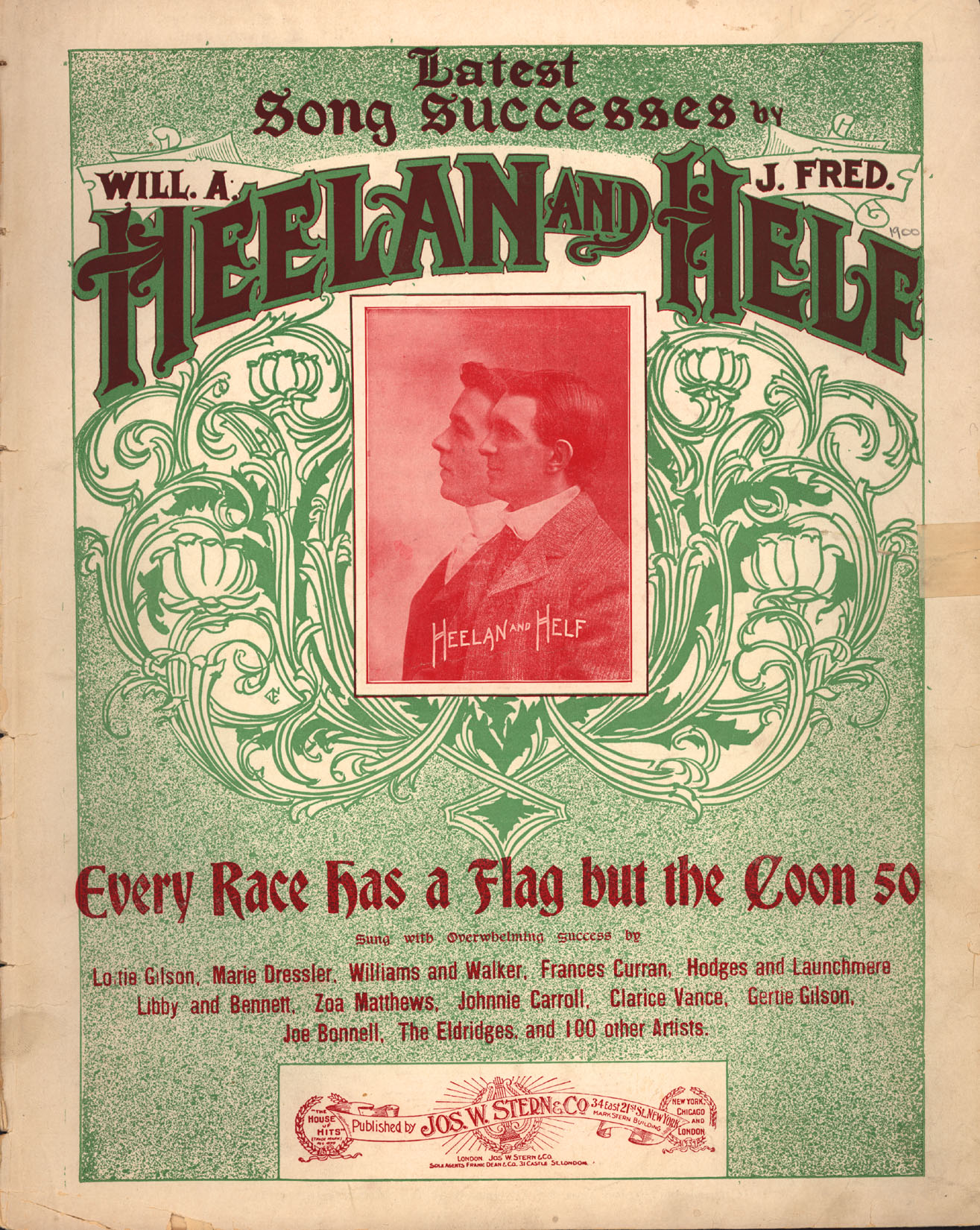
Sheet music to "Every Race Has a Flag But the Coon"

== Composers ==
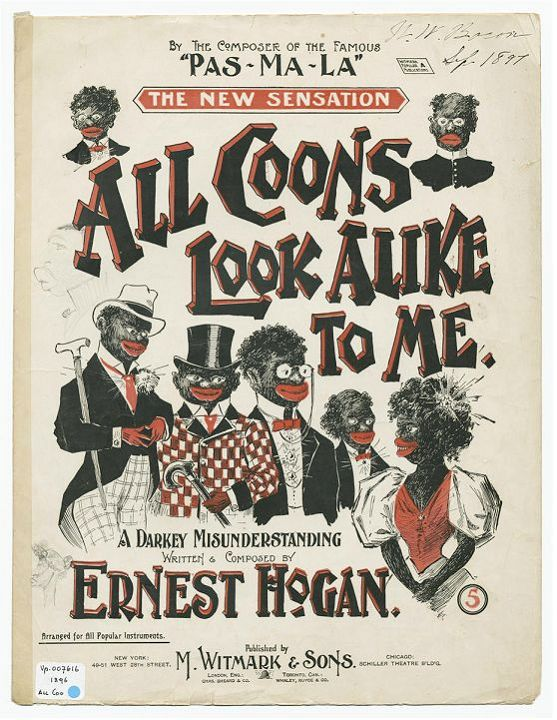
Sheet music to Ernest Hogan's "All Coons Look Alike to Me"

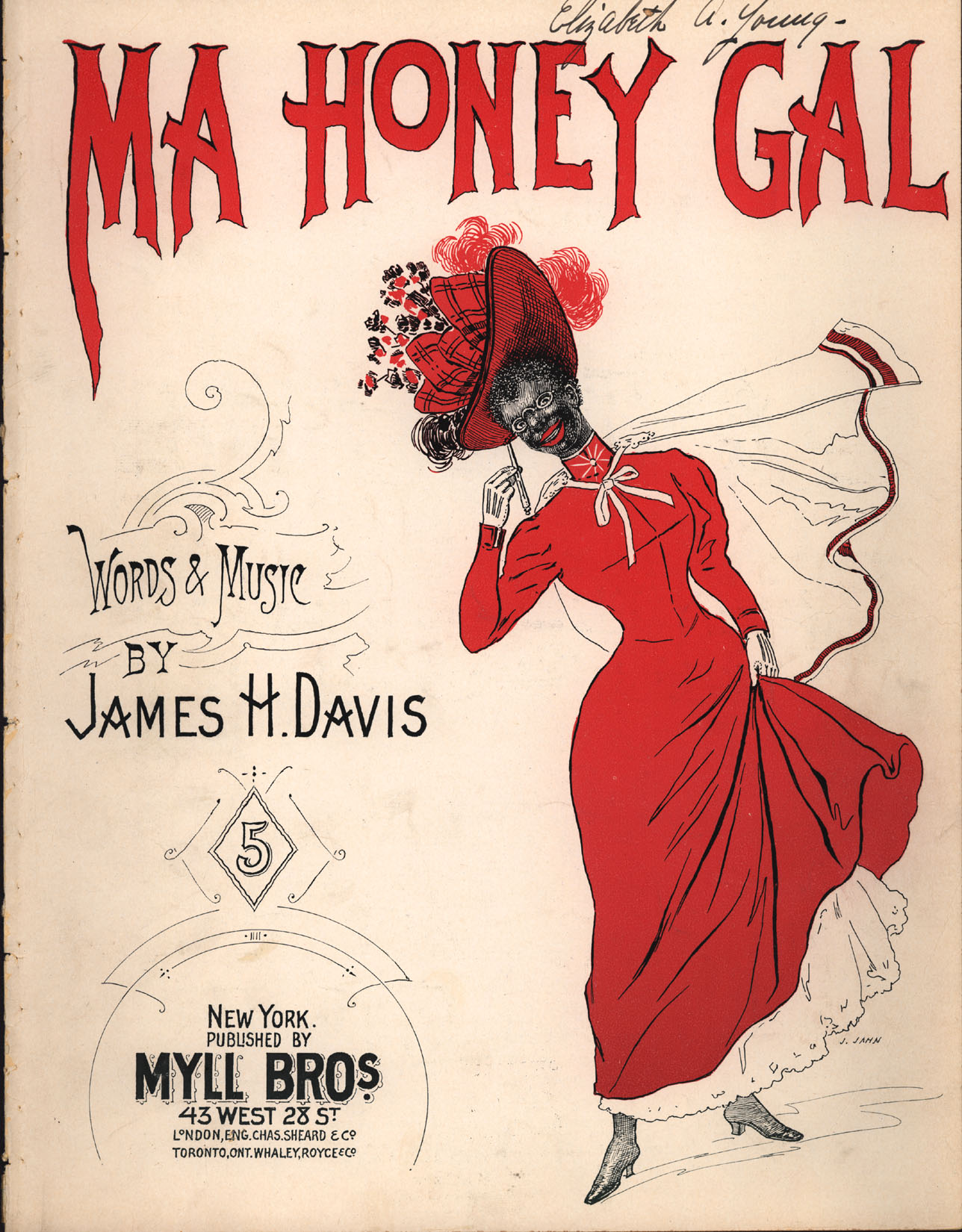
Sheet music to "Ma Honey Gal". Coon songs suggested that the most common living arrangement for black people was a "honey" relationship (unmarried cohabitation), rather than marriage.

At the height of their popularity, "just about every songwriter in the country" was writing coon songs "to fill the seemingly insatiable demand". Writers of coon songs included some of the most important Tin Pan Alley composers, including Gus Edwards, Fred Fisher (who wrote the 1905 "If the Man in the Moon Were a Coon", which sold three million copies), and Irving Berlin. One of John Philip Sousa's assistants, Arthur Pryor, composed coon songs. (This was meant to ensure a steady supply to Sousa's band, which performed the songs and popularized several coon song melodies.) Many coon songs were written by whites, but some were written by black people.

Important black composers of coon songs include Ernest Hogan (who wrote "All Coons Look Alike to Me", the most famous coon song); Sam Lucas (who wrote the most racist early coon songs by modern standards); minstrel and songwriter Sidney L. Perrin (who wrote "Black Annie", "Dat's De Way to Spell Chicken", "Mamma's Little Pumpkin Colored Coons", "Gib Me Ma 15 Cents", and "My Dinah"); Bob Cole (who wrote dozens of songs, including "I Wonder What the Coon's Game Is?" and "No Coons Allowed"); Irving Jones, Bert Williams and George Walker. Even classic ragtime composer Scott Joplin wrote at least one coon song ("I Am Thinking of My Pickaninny Days"), and may have composed the music for several more, using lyrics written by others.

== Characteristics ==
Coon songs almost always aimed to be funny and incorporated the syncopated rhythms of ragtime music. A coon song's defining characteristic, however, was its caricature of African Americans. In keeping with the older minstrel image of black people, coon songs often featured "watermelon- and chicken-loving rural buffoon[s]". However, black people "began to appear as not only ignorant and indolent, but also devoid of honesty or personal honor, given to drunkenness and gambling, utterly without ambition, sensuous, libidinous, even lascivious." black people were portrayed as making money through gambling, theft, and hustling, rather than working to earn a living, as in the Nathan Bivins song "Gimme Ma Money":

Last night I did go to a big Crap game,
How dem coons did gamble wuz a sin and a shame...
I'm gambling for my Sadie,
Cause she's my lady,
I'm a hustling coon, ... dat's just what I am.

Coon songs portrayed black people as "hot", in this context meaning promiscuous and libidinous. They suggested that the most common living arrangement was a "honey" relationship (unmarried cohabitation), rather than marriage. Black people were portrayed as inclined toward acts of provocative violence. Razors were often featured in the songs and came to "symbolize" black people's "wanton tendencies". However, violence in the songs was uniformly directed at black people instead of whites (perhaps to discharge the threatening notion of black violence amongst the coon songs' predominantly white consumers). Hence, the spectre of black-on-white violence remained illusive. The street-patrolling "bully coon" was often used as a stock character in coon songs. The songs showed the social threats that whites believed were posed by black people. Passing was a common theme, and black people were portrayed as seeking the status of whites, through education and money. However, black people rarely, except during dream sequences, actually succeeded at appearing white; they only aspired to do so.

== Use in theater ==
Coon songs were popular in vaudeville theater, where they were delivered by "coon shouters", who were typically white women. Notable coon shouters included Artie Hall, Sophie Tucker, May Irwin, Mae West, Fanny Brice, Fay Templeton, Lotta Crabtree, Marie Dressler, Blossom Seeley, Emma Carus, Ada Jones, Nora Bayes, Rae Samuels, Blanche Ring, Clarice Vance, Elsie Janis, Trixie Friganza, Eva Tanguay and Julia Gerity. As with minstrel shows earlier, a whole genre of skits and shows grew up around coon songs, and often coon songs were featured in legitimate theater productions.

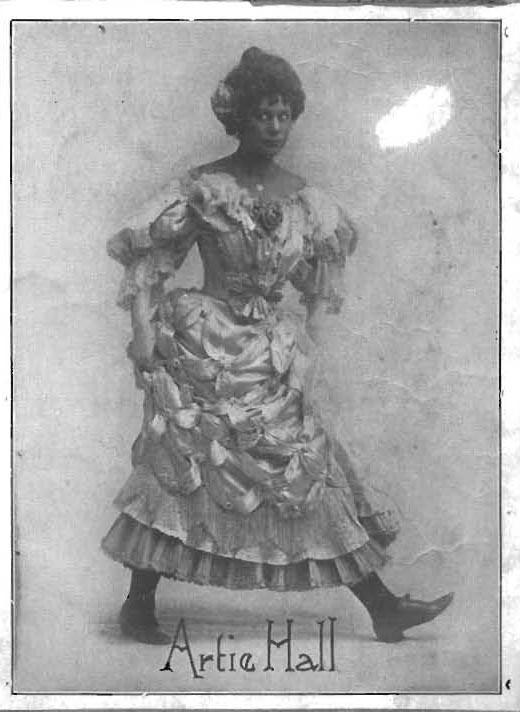
Artie Hall in blackface on the sheet music cover to "Jessamine" (c) 1906 Jerome H. Remick & Co. NY, NY

== Effects on African-American music ==
Coon songs contributed to the development and acceptance of authentic African-American music. Elements from coon songs were incorporated into turn-of-the-century African-American folk songs, as was revealed by Howard W. Odum's 1906–1908 ethnomusicology fieldwork. Similarly, coon songs' lyrics influenced the vocabulary of the blues, culminating with Bessie Smith's singing in the 1920s. The term "Coon shouting" has also been used to describe an energetic singing technique used by black female singers like Josephine Baker and Ethel Waters, though Waters emphasized that her delivery was softer than 'shouters' like Smith and Ma Rainey. Black songwriters and performers who participated in the creation of coon songs profited commercially, enabling them to go on to develop a new type of African-American musical theater based at least in part on African-American traditions. Coon songs also contributed to the mainstream acceptance of ragtime, paving the way for the acceptance of other African-American music. Hogan, when discussing "All Coons Look Alike to Me" shortly before his death, commented:

(That) song caused a lot of trouble in and out of show business, but it was also good for show business because at the time money was short in all walks of life. With the publication of that song, a new musical rhythm was given to the people. Its popularity grew and it sold like wildfire... That one song opened the way for a lot of colored and white songwriters. Finding the rhythm so great, they stuck to it ... and now you get hit songs without the word 'coon.' ... [Ragtime] would have been lost to the world if I had not put it on paper.

== See also ==
- Sherman H. Dudley
- Black Vaudeville
