= Artie Hall =

American actress

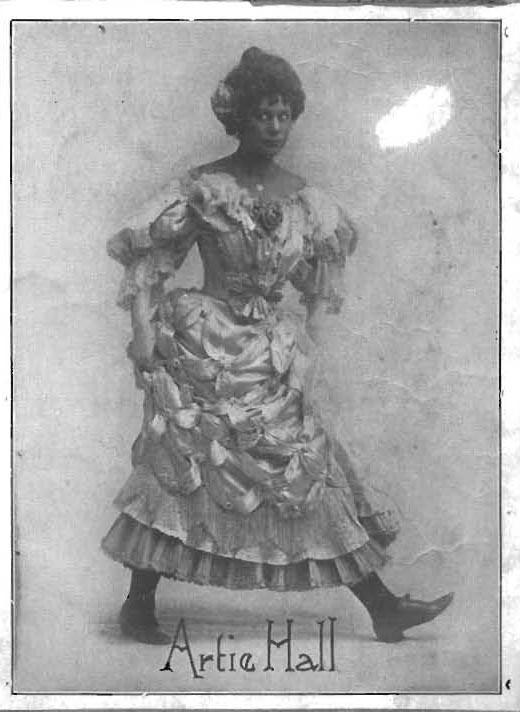
- Cover to 1906 "Jessamine" sheet music
- Born: c. 1881; Georgia, United States
- Died: March 20, 1939 (aged 58); Queens, New York
- Occupation: Vaudeville performer
- Spouse: Robert Fulgora

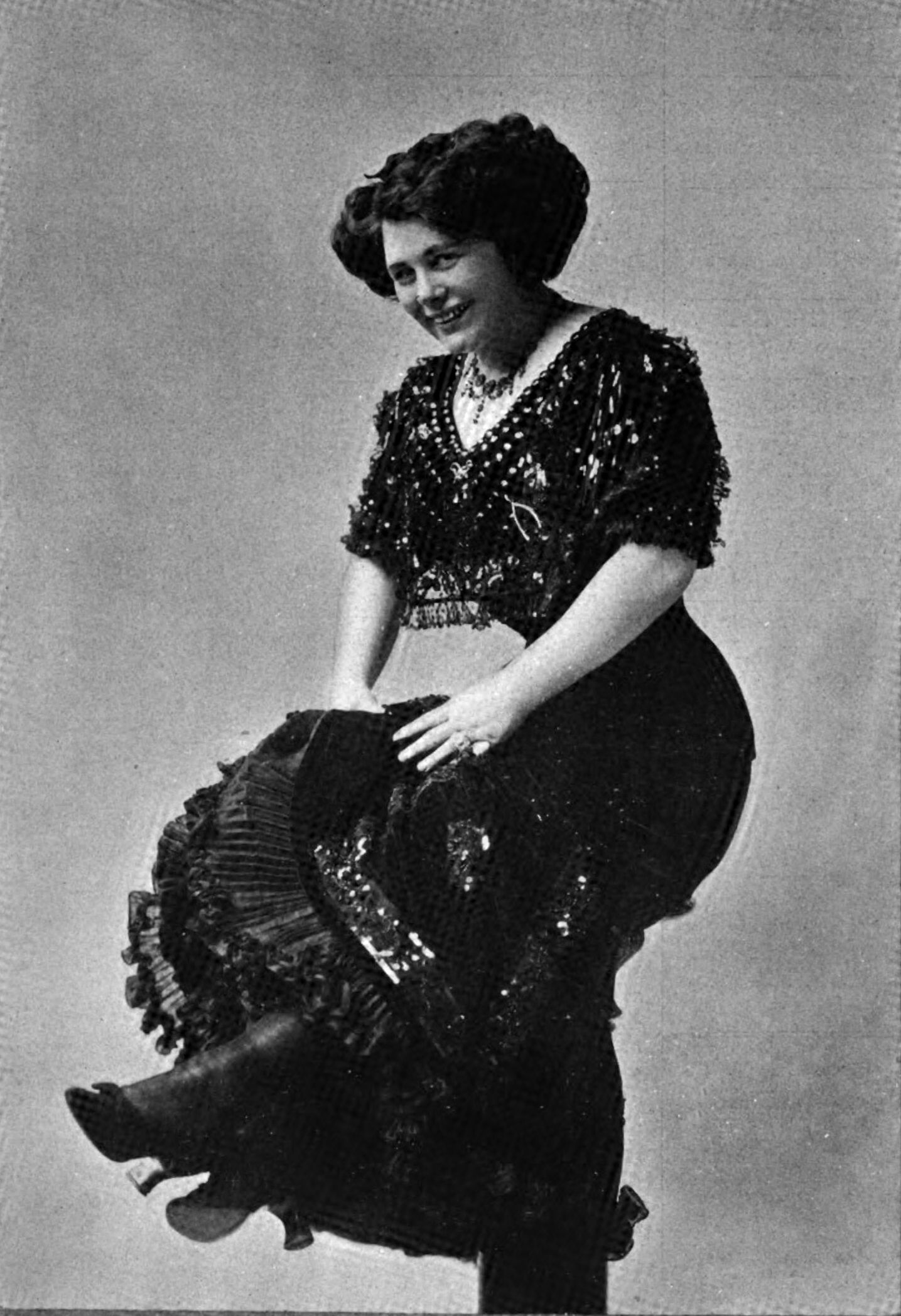
Artie Hall out of costume.

Artie Hall (c. 1881–1939) was an American vaudeville singer and actress, known for her blackface performances as a coon shouter. She was a "petite vocalist with a strong voice". Her most successful role was Topsy in William A. Brady's version of Uncle Tom's Cabin. A controversial part of her act was the removal of a glove to reveal her white skin at the end of a song.

Artie Hall was initially reported to have died during the April 18, 1906, San Francisco earthquake. This apparently was misconstrued, and misquoted by The New York Times before it was discovered she didn't die.

Hall was married circa 1899 to an actor named Robert Fulgora. They were divorced by September 1914. She later married William Atwell, a vaudeville agent. Hall died from a kidney ailment at her home in Astoria, Queens, New York on March 20, 1939, aged 58.

Her sister, Pauline Des Landes (known professionally as Bonita) was also a vaudeville actress.
