= Julia Gerity =

American singer (1898–1955)

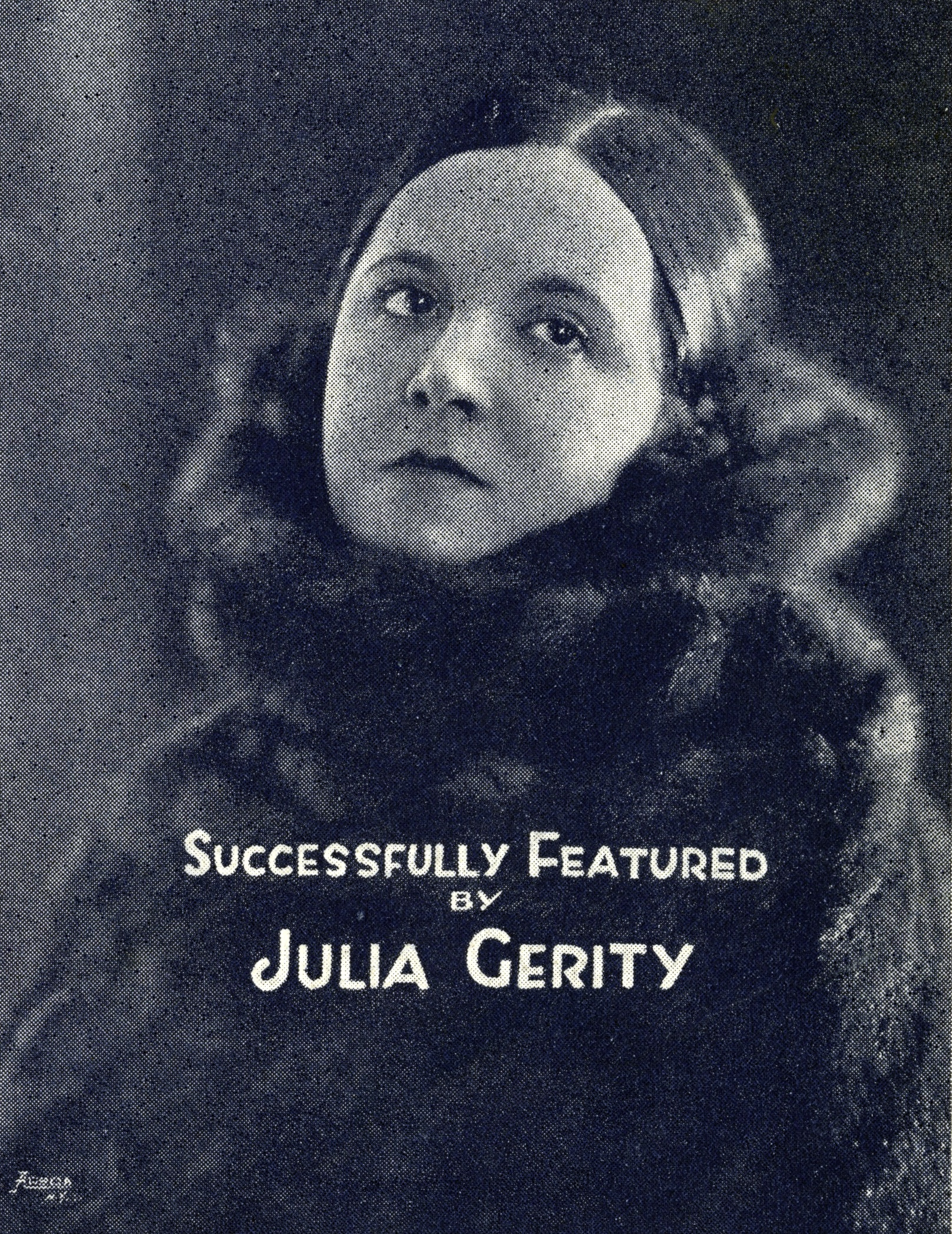
- Julia Gerity, from a photograph on the cover of sheet music "Sweetness" (words by Bob Schafer and Dave Ringle, music by Jimmy Durante), 1921
- Born: July 22, 1898; New York City, U.S.
- Died: March 16, 1955; New York City, U.S.
- Occupation: singer

Julia Gerity (July 22, 1898 – March 16, 1955) was a singer of popular music, most often identified with blues singing. Today she is known primarily through her recordings.

== Biography ==
No information has been found concerning her earliest years. A notice from November 1914 indicated she was "The queen of ragtime" and appeared at Fenton's Pekin in Buffalo, New York, a restaurant known as "one of the great pre-Prohibition pleasure palaces of Buffalo". A 1915 notice in Variety indicates that she had been a song demonstrator at the Waterson, Berlin & Snyder, Inc. publishing firm, and had recently left the company to appear at the College Inn, a nightclub on 125th Street in Manhattan (Harlem). An anonymous writer in 1916 noted that there were many "coon shouters" in Coney Island, but that Julia Gerity "of the College Arms" (apparently a cabaret or restaurant) made them sit up and take notice. "She can certainly put over the songs", the writer concluded. Notices in 1918 state that Gerity, formerly with Watson's "Beef Trust," is now appearing at the Alamo Cabaret at Coney Island where "she is making a wonderful name for herself" as "the most popular coon shouter of the Alamo." The notice concludes that she will not return to burlesque. By 1919 she was already labeled "the well-known blues singer" by Billboard, one of the leading entertainment industry magazines. The article noted that she was a hit at the Winter Garden Theatre singing the song "Why Don't You Drive My Blues Away?" and had been signed by the Shubert brothers for a year. That same year an advertisement for the Tokio cabaret and restaurant in Manhattan labeled her "the syncopated marvel."

Gerity's life was that of a typical vaudevillian where her engagements took her to numerous towns. Notices in Billboard put her in various places such as Louisville, Kentucky, New Orleans, and Saratoga Springs, New York A notice in Billboard for June 1925 notes that she was appearing at Perry's Cabaret in Coney Island. By December 1925 she was at the Little Club, "New Orleans' most exclusive club." But most of Gerity's notices from 1926 through the late 1930s speak about her in Chicago, suggesting that Chicago had become her home base from 1926 through at least the mid-1930s. A particular highlight was the 1934 annual convention of the Coin Machine Manufacturers' Association which met in the Grand Ballroom of the Sherman Hotel in Chicago and received favorable notices for its choice of entertainment, including Gerity. At the time Gerity was appearing at the Paramount Club; Billboard called her a "clever blues singer."

By 1938 she was back in New York City and appeared at the Queens Terrace nightclub in Woodside, Queens, New York. By 1940 she was doing "lusty vocalizing" at the New York Friars' Club. That same year she began a six-year engagement with Jimmy Dwyer's Sawdust Trail. Located at 156 W. 44th, the Sawdust Trail had an "atmosphere that is a blend of the Old West, Diamond Jim Brady's Gay Nineties and a smattering of an old English pub." Perhaps because of the setting, one of the notices in the New York Post referred to her as the "Irish nightingale." On February 26, 1942, friends and the musicians of the Sawdust Trail honored Gerity for thirty years in show business (implying that her career began in 1912).

On May 10, 1947, Gerity started a 10-week engagement at the Shamrock Irish House, a restaurant/cabaret/bar on Coney Island. On May 12, the Shamrock was among many establishments engulfed in a massive fire that began on Surf Avenue. Billboard reported that the fire destroyed much of Gerity's material including gowns, orchestrations, and special material numbers.

Gerity appeared in the "Gay 90s Revue" at the Gay Cafe as one of the "famous stars of yesteryear." She was at Coney Island in summer 1950, this time at Sindell's Stable. Later that summer she went back to the Shamrock Irish House. One of the last notices about Julia Gerity has her in Kokomo, Indiana in 1953. A notice in the Kokomo Tribune advertises "The Gaslight Gayeties", a Gay Nineties revue as being "direct from Broadway" featuring Gerity, the "sweetheart of sweet songs."

Julia V. Gerity died on March 16, 1955.

== Discography ==
=== Released recordings ===
- "Nobody Knows" Accompanied by Yerke's Jazarimba Band, Aeolian Vocalion 12230 (1919)
- "Why Don't You Drive My Blues Away" (Lovesick Blues) Accompanied by Yerke's Jazarimba Band, Aeolian Vocalion 12230 (1919)
- "A Good Man is Hard to Find", accompanied by male trio, Snooks and his Memphis Stompers, matrix 70225 take 1, issued as Victor 22812 (recorded September 11, 1931)
- "Sittin' on a Rubbish Can", accompanied by Snooks and his Memphis Stompers, matrix 70984 take 1, issued as Victor 22896 (recorded December 18, 1931)

=== Unreleased recordings ===
- "Why Don't You Drive My Blues Away", (recorded October 23, 1919)
- "Sister Kate" (recorded April 19, 1923)
- "Mammy Lu" (recorded April 19, 1923)
