= Joseph P. Skelly =

Composer (1850-1895)

- Born: 29 July 1850 Ireland
- Died: 23 June 1895 (aged 44) New York City, New York, U. S.
- Occupation: Composer

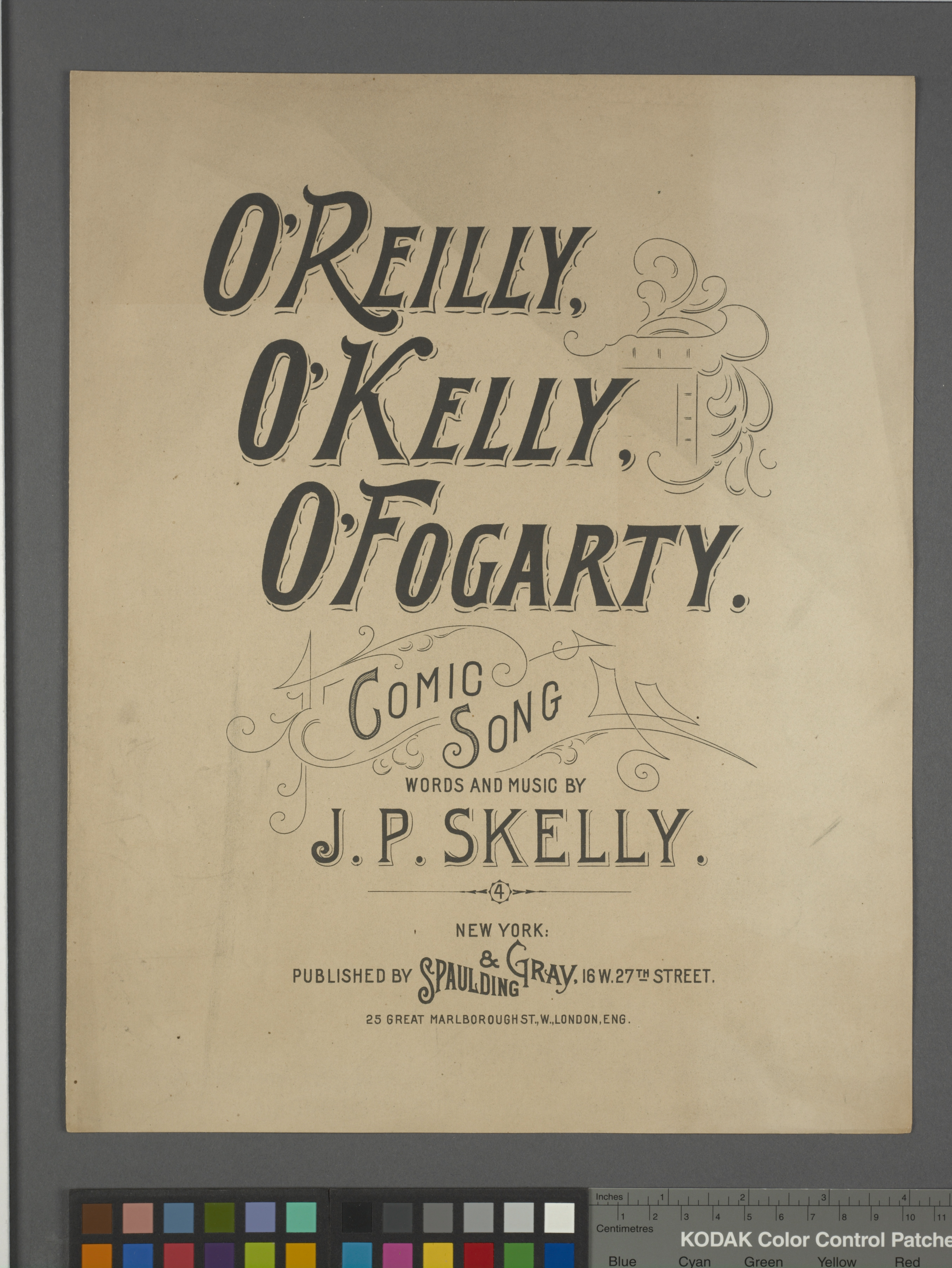

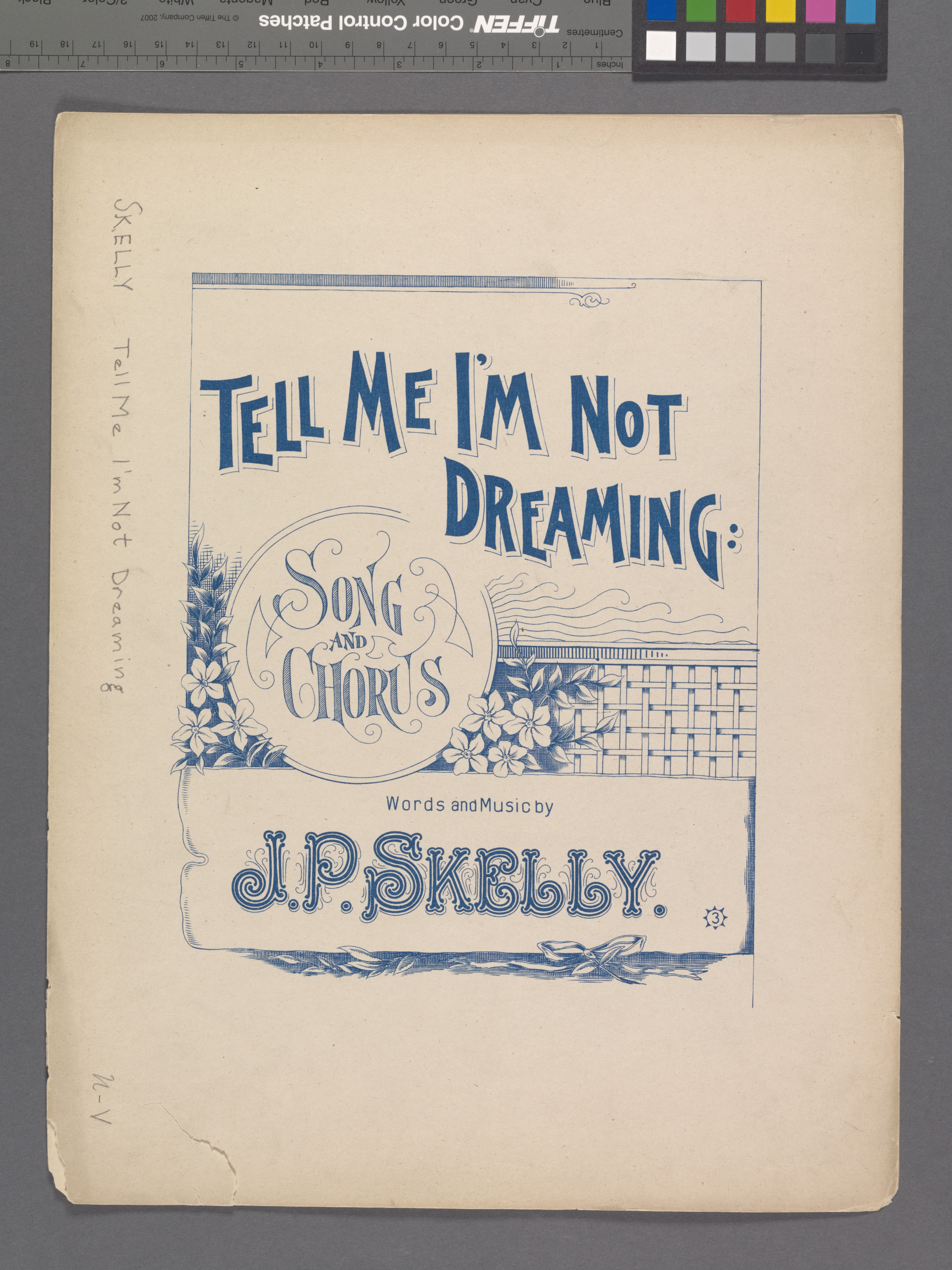

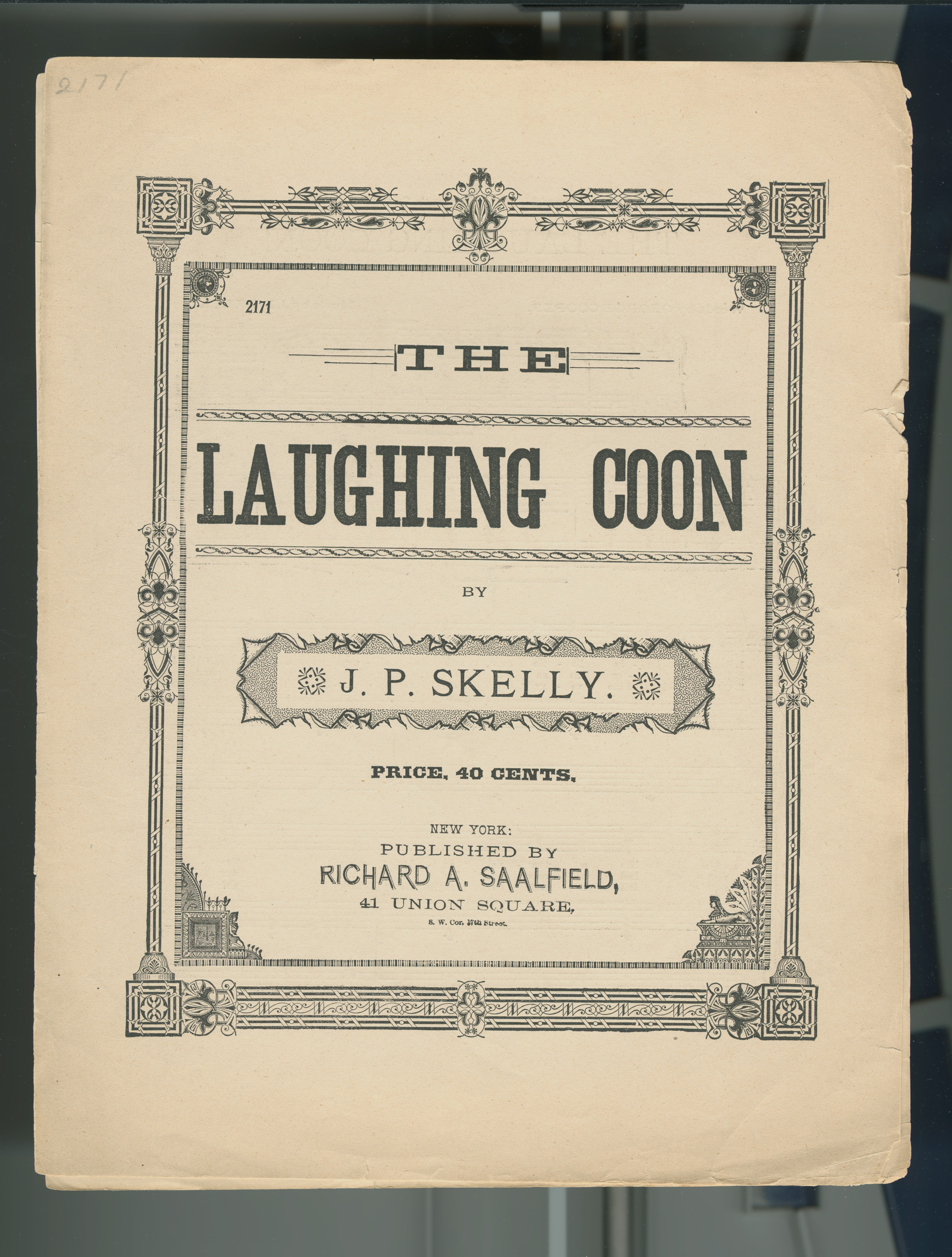
"The Laughing Coon" sheet music, a coon song

Joseph Paul Skelly, also abbreviated J. P. Skelly, (29 July 1850 – 23 June 1895) was a composer of music. He arranged the music for songs published as sheet music. For other songs he composed the words and music. The Lester S. Levy Sheet Music Collection at Johns Hopkins University has sheet music for many of the songs he composed. The Library of Congress has several of his works in its collection.

Skelly was born in Ireland and died in New York City. He wrote more than 1,000 songs.

His song "Little Darling, Dream of Me" was recorded by the Climax Quartet on Climax Records (an early Columbia Records label). He wrote the song "A Boy's Best Friend Is His Mother". It was sung by William Raymond of Thatcher, Primrose and West's Minstrels. Vernon Dalhart recorded the song at Columbia Records in 1925.

He wrote the 1876 comical Irish musical sketch The Hash Brigade. Various artists including Ernest Pike and Elizabeth Spencer recorded his songs on cylinders in the decades after his death.

== Recorded works ==
- "Aint You Awful! (1874)
- "He Isn't a Marrying Man" (1875)
- "Dat Gay Old Nigger Ball"(1875)
- "Fifth Avenue George" (1876)
- "My Pretty Red Rose" (1877)
- "I Should Say So!" (1877)
- "My Love's a Big Drum Major" (1877)
- "Why Did They Dig Ma's Grave So Deep?" (1880)
- "Goldilocks, Grandpa's Darling. Ballad." (1880)
- "The Dandy Coon's Parade" (1880)
- "Keep the Horseshoe Over the Door" (1880)
- "Since James Put on High Collars" (1880)
- "The Boogie Man" (1880)
- "Are You Going to the Ball This Evening?" (1881)
- "Baby's Empty Cradle" (1881)
- "The Old Rustic Bridge by the Mill" (1881)
- "Far From the Old Home!" (1881)
- "De Ole Plantation Coon" (1881)
- "She Gave Me A Pretty Red Rose" (1883)
- "Little Darling, Dream of Me" (1883)
- "The Captivating Dude" (1883)
- "Strolling on the Brooklyn Bridge" (1883)
- "A Boy's Best Friend is His Mother" (1884)
- "Columbia's Son" (1889)
- "The Picture With Its Face Turned to the Wall" (1891)
- "The Picture With Its Face Turned to the Wall" (1891)
- "The Laughing Coon" (1891)
- "Columbus" (1892)
- "Tell Me I'm Not Dreaming" (1893)
- "O'Reilly, O'Kelly, O'Fogarty" (1895)
