= Jawbone (musician) =

American blues musician

Jawbone is the pseudonym of Bob Zabor, an American blues musician from Detroit. He is particularly unusual in that he is a one-man band. The instruments he plays include the harmonica, the guitar and the tambourine. He deliberately aims for a lo-fi sound, akin to early blues recordings.

His work appeared on BBC Radio 1's John Peel show in 2004, and has been included on various magazine CDs there.

== Discography ==
- Dang Blues (2004 CD, Loose Music
- "Hi-De-Hi" b/w "Walter John" (7" Record)
- Johnny Cash Tribute CD (free with Mojo magazine, featuring "Get Rhythm")
- This Is Punk Rock Blues Vol. 1 (Various Artists, CD featuring "4-11-44")
- Hauling (2006 CD, Loose Music)
- "Chug a Lug" b/w "Get Rhythm" (7" Record)
