= Every Race Has a Flag but the Coon =

1901 song

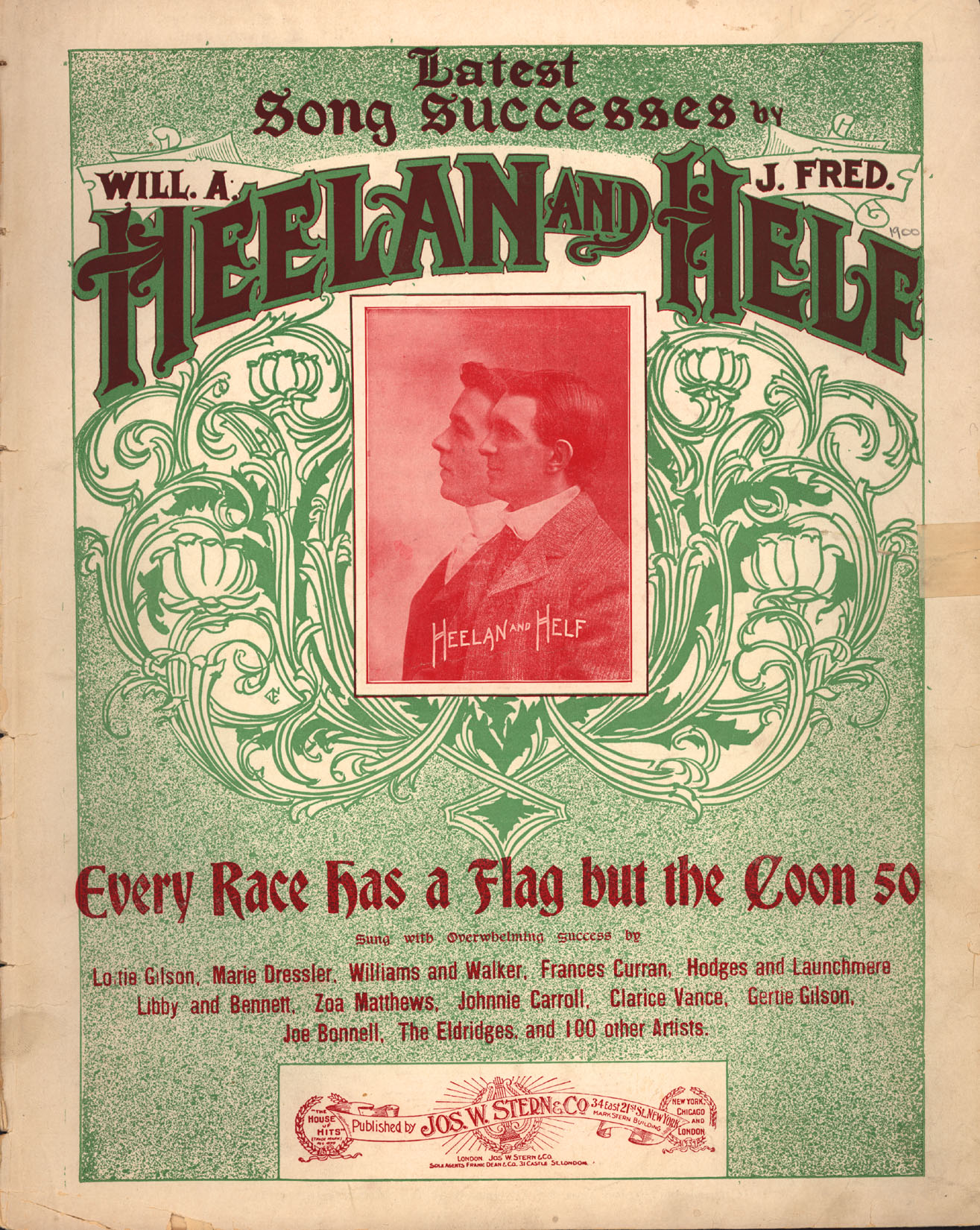
Sheet music for "Every race has a flag but the coon."

"Every Race Has a Flag but the Coon" was a song written by Will A. Heelan, and J. Fred Helf that was popular in the United States and the United Kingdom. The song followed the previous success of "All Coons Look Alike to Me", written in 1896 by Ernest Hogan. H. L. Mencken cites it as being one of the three coon songs that "firmly established the term coon in the American vocabulary".

The song was a musical hit for A. M. Rothschild and Company in 1901. New York's Siegel Cooper Company referred to it as one of their greatest hits the following April. The next month it was sung during "Music on the Piers" in New York, becoming the first song played at the Metropolitan Avenue pier. In his book The Movies That Changed Us: Reflections on the Screen, Nick Clooney refers to the song as part of the "hit parade" of popular music one could use to measure the temper of the times when The Birth of a Nation premiered in 1915. It was also Marie Dressler's contribution to the 'coon' genre. Lottie Gilson, Williams and Walker, Frances Curran, Hodges and Launchmere, Libby and Bennett, Zoa Matthews, Johnnie Carroll, Clarice Vance, Gerie Gilson, Joe Bonnell, The Eldridges and "100 other artists" sang the song with "overwhelming success", according to its sheet music.

The song motivated the creation of the Pan-African flag in 1920 by the members of the Universal Negro Improvement Association and African Communities League. In a 1927 report of a 1921 speech appearing in the Negro World weekly newspaper, Marcus Garvey was quoted as saying,

Show me the race or the nation without a flag, and I will show you a race of people without any pride. Aye! In song and mimicry they have said, "Every race has a flag but the coon." How true! Aye! But that was said of us four years ago. They can't say it now....

== Lyrics ==
The leader of the Blackville Club arose last Labor night
And said, “When we were on parade today
I really felt so much ashamed, I wished I could turn white
‘Cause all the white folks march’d with banners gay
Just at de stand de German band
They waved their flag and played ‘De Wacht am Rhine’
The Scotch Brigade each man arrayed
In new plaid dresses marched to ‘Auld Lang Syne’
Even Spaniards and Sweeds, folks of all kinds and creeds
Had their banner—except de coon alone
Ev’ry nation can brag ‘bout some kind of a flag—
Why can’t we get an emblem of our own?”

Chorus:
For Ireland has her Harp and Shamrock
England floats her Lion bold
Even China waves a Dragon
Germany an Eagle gold
Bonny Scotland loves a Thistle
Turkey has her Crescent Moon
And what won’t Yankees do for their Red, White and Blue
Every race has a flag but the coon

He says, “Now I’ll suggest a flag that ought to win a prize
Just take a flannel shirt and paint it red
They draw a chicken on it with two poker dice for eyes
An’ have it wavin’ razors ‘round its head.
You might also like
To make it quaint, you’ve got to paint
A possum with a pork chop in his teeth;
To give it tone, a big hambone
You sketch upon a banjo underneath
And be sure not to skip just a policy slip
Have it marked four eleven forty-four;
Then them Irish and Dutch, they can’t guy us so much,
We should have had this emblem long before.”
