= Richard M. Walters =

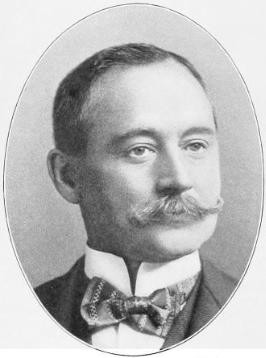
Richard M. Walters

Richard M. Walters (September 29, 1851 – January 14, 1902) was an American piano and organ manufacturer. In 1890 he purchased Conrad Narvesen's piano manufacturing company, and continued to make pianos using the Narvesen name. He was also active in local New York City politics. He died in 1902 at the age of 50.

== Life and career ==
The son of Richard and Ellen Walters, Richard M. Walters was born in New York City on September 29, 1851 in an area of Lower Manhattan that was then known as the Seventh Ward. In the 1870s he began working in his native city as a maker of actions for the piano. In 1890 he purchased Conrad Narvesen's piano manufacturing firm which was then known as Narvesen, Hangaard & Bergmann. He continued to manufacture pianos using the Narvesen name. One of his contracts was with the New York Board of Education; supplying the pianos to New York City Public Schools. His company also made organs.

Walters was a Roman Catholic, he lived on the premises of the Catholic Club of New York of which he was a member. He never married. He was an active member of the Irish National Land League and was well known in New York political circles. In 1878 he ran for the New York City Board of Aldermen and was on the Republican Party's ticket in the fourth ward. He ran against Tammany Hall politician John F. Galvin; ultimately losing to him. In 1885 he was elected secretary of the Irish Parliamentary Fund Association. In 1900 he was vice president of the Merchants and Manufacturers Board of Trade.

Walters died on January 14, 1902. He died in the home of his brother, Charles Walters, at 83 West 119th st in South Harlem. His funeral was held at St. Thomas the Apostle Church.
