= Yasuji Kiyose =

Japanese composer

- 清瀬保二
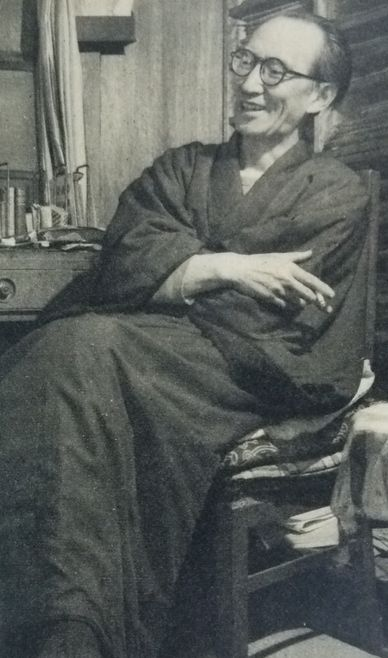
- Kiyose in 1955
- Born: 13 January 1900; Yamagata, Empire of Japan
- Died: 14 September 1981 (aged 81)
- Occupation: Composer

Yasuji Kiyose (清瀬 保二 Kiyose Yasuji, 13 January 1900 – 14 September 1981) was a Japanese composer. He studied composition privately with Kōsaku Yamada and Kōsuke Komatsu and in 1930, took an active part in organizing the Shinkō Sakkyokuka Renmei, (which later grew into the Japanese section of the ISCM).

In 1948, Kiyose took on Hiroyoshi Suzuki and Tōru Takemitsu for a brief period as pupils in composition.

His music at times incorporates Japanese pentatonic scales, and other elements of Japanese folk-song; his far better known pupil Takemitsu, developed this tendency further in a great number of his works.

== Major works ==
- Six Japanese Folk Songs from Shinano District for voice and piano (1929)
- Country Dances for piano (1930)
- Short Suite for piano (1931)
- Piano Compositions No. 1 (1931–34)
- Dance on the Seashore for piano (1932)
- Spring Time at the Hills for piano (1932)
- Folk Dances for piano (1933)
- Two Dances for piano (1934)
- Little Suite for piano (1935)
- Ryūkyū Dances for piano (1936)
- To Ancient Times for orchestra (1937)
- Scherzo for two pianos (1937)
- Piano Compositions No. 2 (1937–40)
- Japanese Festival Dance for orchestra (1942)
- Violin Sonata No. 1 (1942)
- Ballade for piano (1943)
- Four Preludes for piano (1947)
- Violin Sonata No. 2 (1948)
- String Trio (1949)
- Cello Sonata (1950)
- Violin Sonata No. 3 (1950)
- String Quartet in B flat (1952)
- Piano Concerto (1954)
- The March of Snake Festival for male chorus and piano (1954)
- Japanese Folk Songs for violin and piano (1955)
- Two Movements for Violin and Piano (1960)
- An Unknown Soldier for mezzo-soprano, tenor, mixed chorus and orchestra (1962)
- Shakuhachi Trio (1964)
- Quintet for 2 Shakuhachi, 2 Koto and Jushichigen (1965)
- Quartet for Shakuhachi, 2 Koto and Jushichigen (1965)
- Recorder Quartet (1969)
- Trio for Recorders (1972)
