= B. H. Haggin =

American journalist and music critic

Bernard H. Haggin (December 29, 1900 – May 28, 1987) was an American journalist and music critic.

== Early life ==
Haggin was born in New York City, on December 29, 1900, the son of Samuel Hurwitz and Tonie Herschman Hurwitz. He went to school in Manhattan and, too young for conscription in World War I, completed his high school education in 1918. He went on to the City College of New York, where he graduated in 1922. The following year he published his first music review.

== Career ==
Haggin wrote as a freelance, reviewing music and dance, until October 1934, when he was appointed music critic of the Brooklyn Daily Eagle, retaining the post until 1937. From 1936 to 1957 he was music critic of the weekly magazine The Nation. The American National Biography says of his work there: "Not given to self-doubt, Haggin attributed the reputation he earned in the Nation to 'a musician's ear, and an ability to assemble words in orderly, clear statements'".

From 1946 to 1949, at the invitation of Virgil Thomson, its chief music critic, Haggin contributed a column about music on the radio for The New York Herald Tribune. After his tenure at The Nation ended, he reviewed music and ballet for The Hudson Review from 1958 to 1972, records for The New Republic from 1958 to 1966 and music from 1975 to 1978, and records for The Yale Review until 1985, among other publications.

He wrote twelve books on music and two on ballet. He was the author of the first general guide to recorded classical music, Music on Records (1938), later expanded as The Listener's Musical Companion (1956, 1967 and 1971).

Haggin died in Manhattan on 28 May 1987 after a short illness, age 86 years. He never married.

== Critical assessment ==
Haggin's ability to write short, clear reviews was an advantage at a time when the discursive columns of an earlier generation of critics such as William J. Henderson, James Huneker and Deems Taylor were less sought after by editors. Haggin said in an interview in 1980, "The equipment I began with was a musician's ear, and an ability to assemble words in orderly, clear statements, and this remained the equipment with which, as I continued, I heard more and wrote better". In the view of The New York Times, despite Haggin's claim, his later writing was inferior to his early work.

Haggin's prose was admired and sometimes praised by many of his contemporaries, but his rigid views were less well received by his fellow critics. His obituarist in The New York Times wrote:

Many found his opinions narrow. He had no sympathy for most 20th-century music – he deplored Bartók, Schoenberg, Ives, most of the works of Berg, and virtually everyone who came after them – and worshipped certain artists, notably Arturo Toscanini, at the expense of all others. In his later work, he also developed the habit of attacking other critics, sometimes vitriolically.

== Books ==
Books listed in chronological order.

- A Book of the Symphony (New York: Oxford University Press, 1937)
- Music on Records (New York: Oxford University Press, 1938); revised as: Music on Records: a New Guide to the Music, the Performances, the Recordings (New York: Alfred Knopf, 1940, 1941 (2nd edition, revised), 1945)
- Music for the Man who Enjoys 'Hamlet (New York: Alfred Knopf, 1944; reissued as Music for One who enjoys Hamlet, New York: Horizon Press, 1983 ISBN 0818012242)
- Conversations with Toscanini (New York: Doubleday, 1959)
- The Toscanini Musicians Knew (New York: Horizon Press, 1967); 2nd edition 1980 ISBN 9780818012044)
- The New Listener's Companion and Record Guide (New York: Horizon Press, 1967); 2nd edition: 1968; 3rd edition: 1971 ISBN 9780818012075; 4th edition: 1974 ISBN 9780818012112; 5th edition 1978 ISBN 9780818012167)
- A Decade of Music (New York: Horizon Press, 1973 ISBN 9780818012105)
- Music Observed (New York: Oxford University Press, 1964); reissued as 35 Years of Music (New York: Horizon Press, 1974 ISBN 9780818012136)
- Music and Ballet, 1973-1983 (New York: Horizon Press, 1984 ISBN 9780818012266)
- Arturo Toscanini: Contemporary Recollections of the Maestro, containing reprints of two titles: Conversations with Toscanini and The Toscanini musicians knew (New York: Da Capo, 1989) ISBN 9780306803567
