= Symphony No. 7 (Glazunov) =

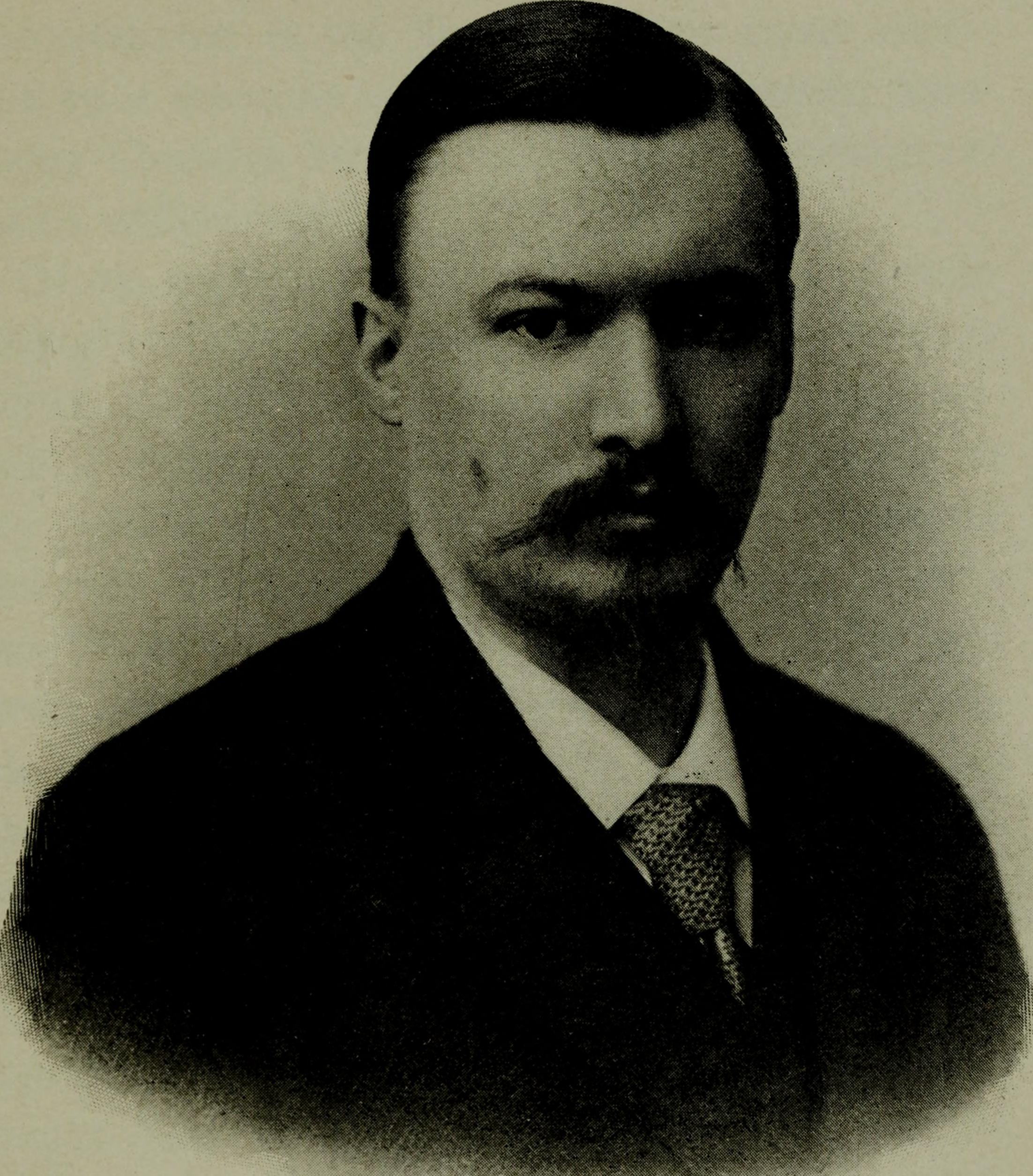
Alexander Glazunov in 1905

The Symphony No. 7 in F major, Pastoral, Op. 77, was completed by Alexander Glazunov on July 4, 1902. It is dedicated to Mitrofan Belyayev.

It is in four movements:

1. Allegro moderato
2. Andante
3. Scherzo: Allegro giocoso
4. Finale: Allegro maestoso
