= Will A. Heelan =

American songwriter

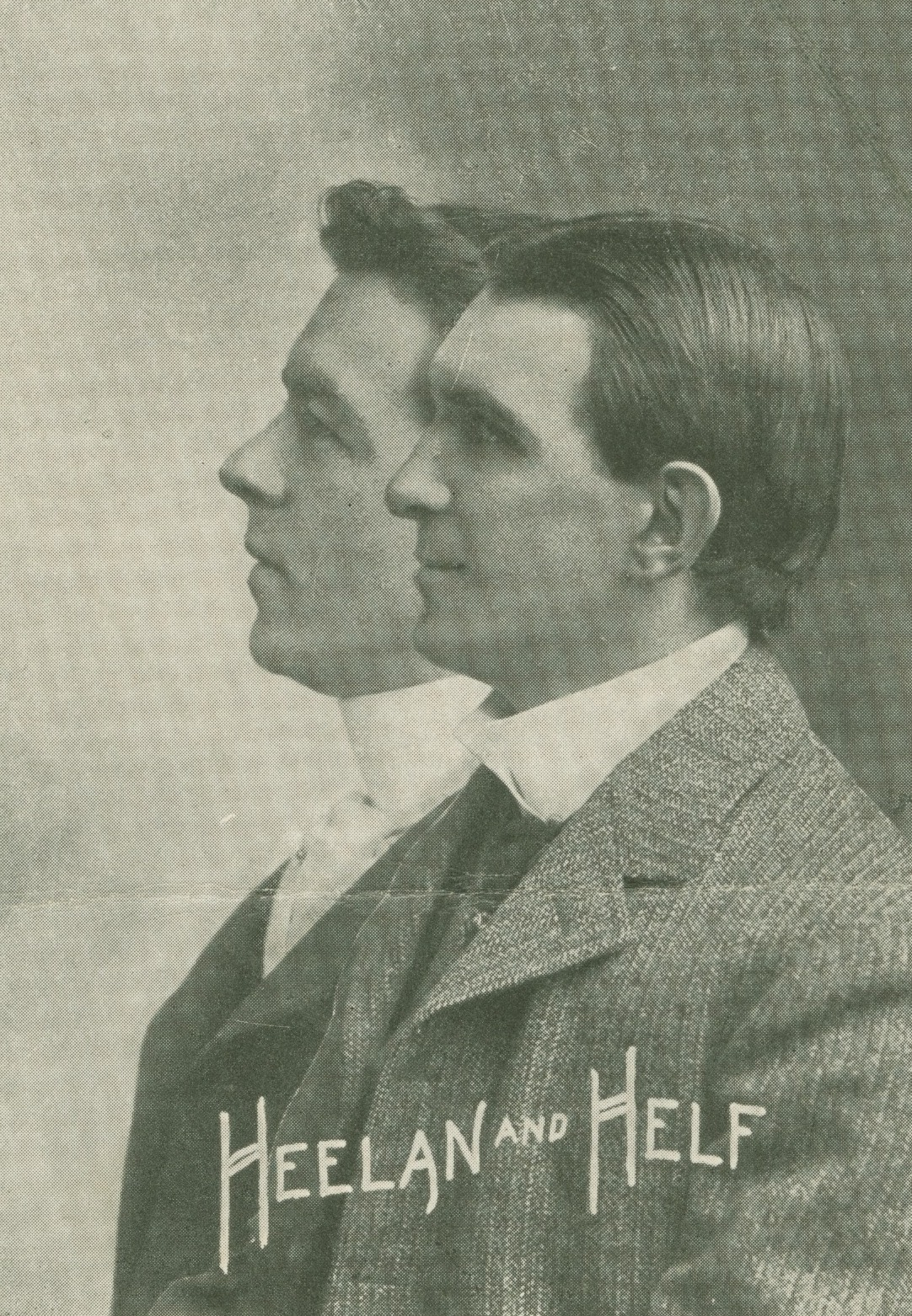
- Heelan and Helf in 1900
- Born: 30 January 1874; New York City, New York, U. S.
- Died: 31 May 1920 (aged 46); New York City, New York, U. S.
- Occupations: Composer, Lyricist

William Aloysius Heelan (30 January 1874 – 31 May 1920) was an American lyricist during the early 20th century. He collaborated with a number of composers and lyricists including E. P. Moran, Seymour Furth, J. Fred Helf and Harry Von Tilzer.

== Credits ==
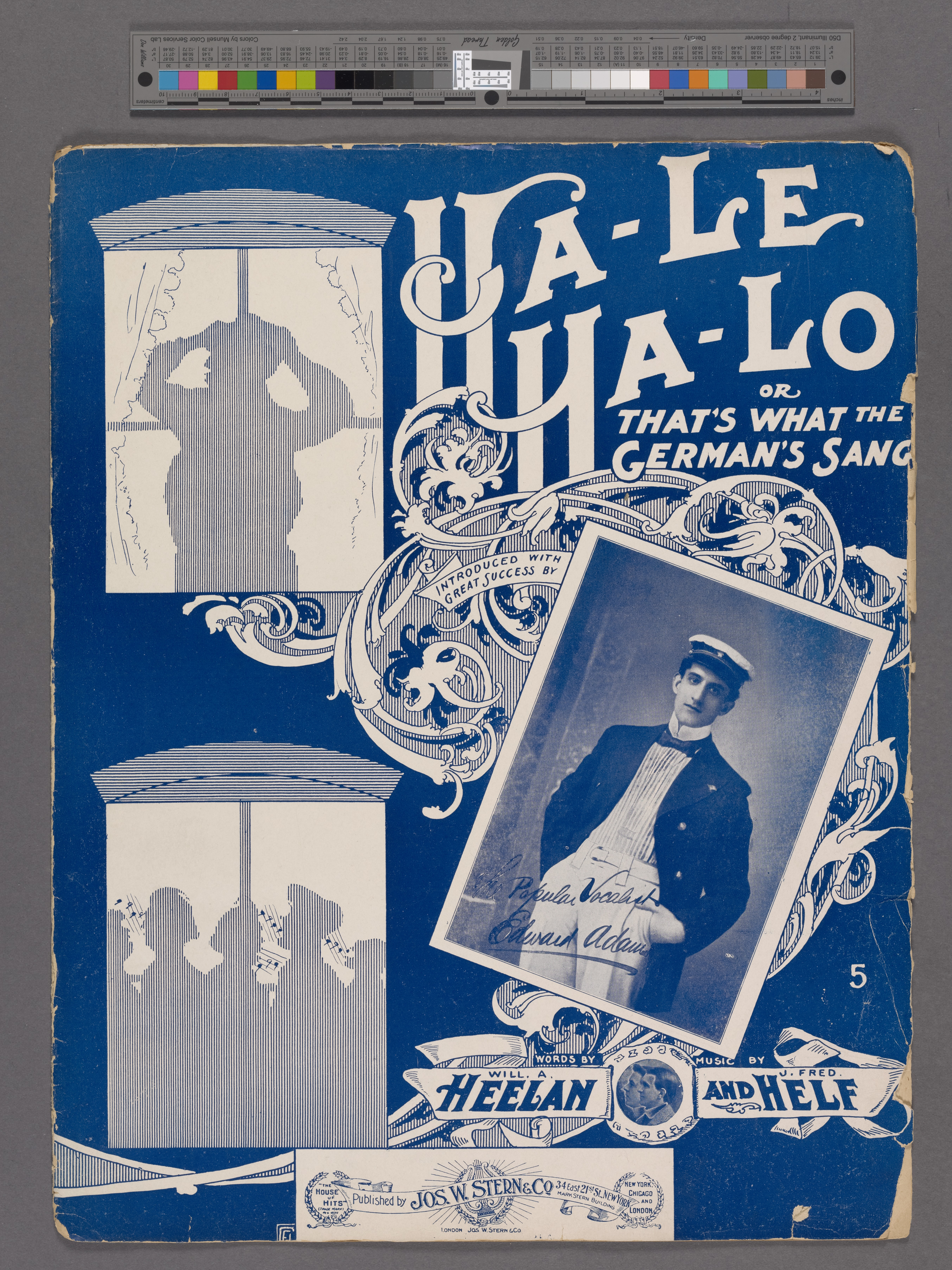
"Ha-le ha-lo" or "That's what the Germans sang"

- 1898: "I Want A Coon To Match My Own Complexion"
- 1899: "I'd Leave My Happy Home for You", "Rauss mit ihm"
- 1900: "Every Race Has a Flag but the Coon", "In The House Of Too Much Trouble", "There Are Two Sides To A Story".
- 1901: "Ha-le ha-lo" or "That's what the Germans sang", "Maizy, my dusky daisy"
- 1902: "The Message Of The Rose".
- 1903: "The Message Of The Rose".
- 1904: "When the Coons have a Dreamland of their Own"
- 1906: "Alice, Where Art Thou Going?", "Nothing Like That In Our Family"
- 1907: "No Wedding Bells For Me".
- 1908: "A Singer Sang A Song".
