= J. Fred Helf =

American songwriter

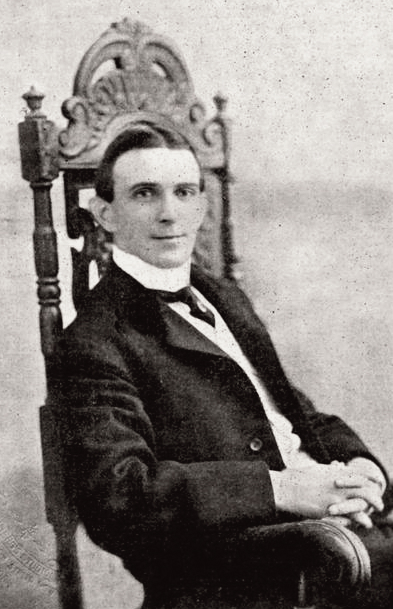
- Helf in 1905
- Born: 1871; Maysville, Kentucky, U. S.
- Died: 19 November 1915 (aged 43–44); Liberty, New York, U. S.
- Occupation: Composer

John Fred. Helf (1871 – November 19, 1915) was an American composer and sheet music publisher during the early 20th century.

Helf was born in Maysville, Kentucky. He went to seek his fortune in New York City at the age of 27. There he composed over 100 songs, some in collaboration with Will A. Heelan.

In October 1910 his music publishing company, J. Fred Helf Music, filed for bankruptcy with Elihu Root Jr. acting as receiver. All the company's property and assets were sold at auction on March 12, 1913, in New York.

He retired from the music business five months before he died due to an illness. He died in Liberty, New York, at the age of 44 leaving a widow and a daughter.

== Credits ==
His credits as composer or co-composer include

- 1898: "Please Mr. Conductor Don't Put Me Off the Train"; "Tillie Tootie The Coney Island Beauty"; "We All Grow Old in Time"
- 1899: "I Ain't Got No Happy Home to Leave"; "A Picture No Artist Can Paint"; "Only a Hard Boiled Egg From Home"
- 1900: "Absent But Not Forgotten"; "Every Race Has a Flag but the Coon"; "The Fatal Rose of Red"; "I Ain't Got No Happy Home To Leave!"; "In the House of Too Much Trouble"; "There Are Two Sides To A Story"; "Tobie I Kind O' Likes You"
- 1902: "If Money Talks, It Ain't On Speaking Terms With Me"; "I'll Be Your Rain-Beau"; "My Mother Was a Northern Girl"
- 1903: "Ev'ry Man Is A Volunteer"; "Now I Lay Me Down To Sleep"; "Since Sally Left Our Alley"
- 1904: "The Battle of the Daisies & the Ferns"; "A Bit O'Blarney"; "Stingy"; "When the Coons have a Dreamland of Their Own"
- 1905: "Everybody Works But Father"; "I'll Be Waiting in the Gloaming, Sweet Genevieve"; "Someone Thinks of Someone"; "The Waltz Must Change to a March Marie"
- 1906: "Ain't You Coming Back to Old New Hampshire, Molly?"; "The Bee That Gets The Honey Doesn't Hang Around The Hive"; "Captain Baby Bunting Of The Rocking Horse Brigade"; "Colleen Bawn"; "Here's To Our Absent Brothers"; "When the Whip-poor-will sings Marguerite"; "When You Know You're Not Forgotten by the Girl You Can't Forget"
- 1907: "I'm Tying the Leaves So They Won't Come Down"; "Neath The Old Acorn Tree, Sweet Estelle"; "Somebody's Always Willin' To Do Somethin' For Somebody"; "Tipperary"; "When it's Moonlight Mary Darling 'neath the old Grape Arbor Shade"; "When Summer Tells Autumn Good-Bye"; "When The Bluebirds Nest Again Sweet Nellie Gray"; "When the Sheep are in the Fold, Jennie Dear"; "When The Springtime Brings The Roses, Jessie Dear"; "Won't You Come Over To Chilly Willie?"
- 1908: "The Booker T's are on parade to-day"; "Daddy's Little Tom Boy Girl"; "Feed The Kitty"; "Make A Noise Like A Hoop And Roll Away"; "Mister Dinkelspiel"; "When Darling Bess First Whispered Yes"; "When We Listened to The Chiming of The Old Church Bell"
- 1909: "When the Bloom Is On the Cotton Dixie Lee"; "When the Evening Bells Are Chiming Songs of Auld Lang Syne"
- 1910: "The Morning After the Night Before"; "When A Boy From Old New Hampshire Loves A Girl From Tennessee
- 1911: "Texas Tommy's Dance"
- 1912: "Lincoln's College Flag"
- 1913: "Fables"; "On a Barnyard Honeymoon"; "When God Gave Me You"
- 1914: "My Love Would Fill a Thousand Hearts"; "Pick Up The Pieces And Bring Them Home"
