= 1909 in music =

This is a list of notable events in music that took place in the year 1909.

== Specific locations ==
- 1909 in Norwegian music

== Specific genres ==
- 1909 in jazz

== Events ==
- January 25 – Richard Strauss's opera Elektra receives its debut performance at the Dresden State Opera.
- February 19 – First production of Bedřich Smetana's opera The Bartered Bride (Prodaná nevěsta) in the United States, at the Metropolitan Opera in New York City, conducted by Gustav Mahler with Ema Destinová in the title role, sung in German.
- February 22 – Thomas Beecham conducts the first concert with his newly established Beecham Symphony Orchestra in the UK.
- May 12 – Leopold Stokowski makes his debut as a conductor, for the Colonne Orchestra in Paris.
- November 8 – Boston Opera House in the United States opens with a performance of La Gioconda starring Lillian Nordica and Louise Homer.
- November 28 – Sergei Rachmaninoff's Piano Concerto No. 3 is premièred in New York City with the composer as soloist.
- December 18 – George Enescu's Octet for Strings and Piano Quartet No. 1 in D Major are premiered together on a program also featuring his Sept chansons de Clement Marot, Op. 15, at the Salle des agriculteurs in Paris, as part of the "Soirées d'Art" concert series.
- Chemnitz Opera in Germany opens.
- Foerster & Sons, musical instrument maker, is founded in Milwaukee.

== Published popular music ==
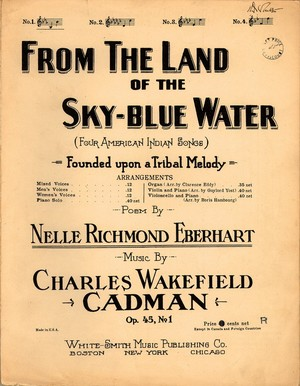

- "Ace In The Hole" w.m. George D. Mitchell & James E. Dempsey
- "And Now Assemble" w. Adrian Ross m. Leo Fall
- "Arcady Is Ever Young" w. Arthur Wimperis m. Lionel Monckton. Introduced by Florence Smithson in the musical The Arcadians.
- "Beautiful Eyes, Beautiful Lies" w. George Whiting & Carter De Haven m. Ted Snyder
- "A Birthday" by Christina Rossetti
- "Blue Feather" w. Jack Mahoney, m. Theodore F. Morse
- "Boiled Beef and Carrots" w.m. Charles Collins & Fred Murray
- "By The Light Of The Silvery Moon" w. Edward Madden m. Gus Edwards
- "Carrie (Carrie Marry Harry)" w. Juni McCree m. Albert Von Tilzer
- "The Ballad of Casey Jones" w. T. Lawrence Seibert m. Eddie Newton
- "Chewska" w. Adrian Ross m. Leo Fall
- "Christmas-Time Seems Years And Years Away" w.m. Irving Berlin & Ted Snyder
- "The Cubanola Glide" w. Vincent P. Bryan m. Harry Von Tilzer
- "The Dollar Princesses" w. Adrian Ross m. Leo Fall
- "Dublin Daisies" m. Percy Wenrich
- "Fickle Fortune" w. Arthur Wimperis m. Lionel Monckton & Howard Talbot
- "For You Alone" w. P. J. O'Reilly m. Henry E. Geehl
- "From the Land of the Sky-Blue Water" w. Nelle Richmond Eberhart m. Charles Wakefield Cadman
- "The Garden of Roses" by J.E. Dempsey
- "Golden Arrow w. Harry Williams, m. Egbert Van Alstyne
- "Heaven Will Protect The Working Girl" w. Edgar Smith m. A. Baldwin Sloane
- "How Do You Do?" w. Adrian Ross m. Leo Fall
- "I Just Came Back To Say Good Bye" w.m. Irving Berlin
- "I Love My Wife, But Oh, You Kid" w.m. Harry Armstrong & Billy Clark
- "I Love, I Love, I Love My Wife—But Oh! You Kid!" m. Harry von Tilzer w. Jimmy Lucas
- "I Wish That You Was My Gal, Molly" w.m. Irving Berlin & Ted Snyder
- "I Wonder Who's Kissing Her Now" w. Will M. Hough & Frank R. Adams m. Joseph E. Howard & Harold Orlob
- "If The Wind Had Only Blown The Other Way" w.m. Edna Williams & Bessie Wynn
- "I'm A Member Of The Midnight Crew" w. William Jerome m. Jean Schwartz
- "I'm Alabama Bound" by Robert Hoffman
- "I'm Awfully Glad I Met You" w. Jack Drislane m. George W. Meyer
- "I'm Glad I'm A Boy/ I'm Glad I'm A Girl" w.m. Nora Bayes & Jack Norworth
- "I'm Going To Do What I Please" w. Alfred Bryan m. Ted Snyder
- "I've Got A Pain In My Sawdust" w. Henry Edward Warner m. Herman Avery Wade
- "I've Got Rings On My Fingers" w. R. P. Weston & F. J. Barnes m. Maurice Scott
- "Let's All Go Down The Strand" w.m. Harry Castling & C. W. Murphy

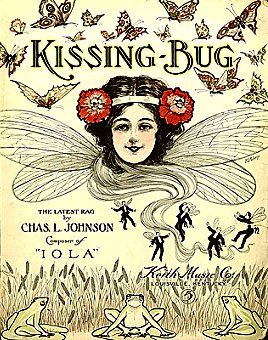

- "Kissing-Bug" m. Charles L. Johnson
- "Let's Go Into A Picture Show" w.m. Junie McCree & Albert von Tilzer
- "The Letter Song" w. Stanislaus Stange m. Oscar Straus
- "Meet Me Tonight in Dreamland" w. Beth Slater Whitson m. Leo Friedman
- "Moonstruck" w.m. Lionel Monckton
- "Moving Day In Jungle Town" w. A. Seymour Brown m. Nat D. Ayer
- "My Cousin Caruso" w. Edward Madden m. Gus Edwards
- "My Hero" w. (Eng) Stanislaus Stange (Ger) Rudolf Bernauer & Leopold Jacobson m. Oscar Straus
- "My Motter" w. Arthur Wimperis m. Howard Talbot
- "My Pony Boy" w. Bobby Heath m. Charles O'Donnell
- "My Prairie Song Bird" w. Jack Drislane, m. George W. Meyer
- "My Southern Rose" by Earl Taylor
- "My Wife's Gone To The Country" w. George Whiting & Irving Berlin m. Ted Snyder
- "Next To Your Mother Who Do You Love" w. Irving Berlin m. Ted Snyder
- "No One Could Do It Like My Father" w.m. Irving Berlin & Ted Snyder
- "Nobody Knows Nobody Cares" w.m. Charles K. Harris
- "Oh! You Candy Kid" w.m. Bob Adams & John Golden
- "Oh, What I Know About You" Irving Berlin, Joseph H. McKeon, Harry M. Piano, W. Raymond Walker
- "On Wisconsin" w. Carl Beck m. W. T. Purdy
- "Only a Dream of You" w. Carol Loveland m. Harry J. Lincoln
- "Our Farm" Caryll & Monckton
- "Pork And Beans" m. Theron C. Bennett
- "Put on Your Old Grey Bonnet" w. Stanley Murphy m. Percy Wenrich
- "Rainbow" w. Alfred Bryan m. Percy Wenrich
- "Sadie Salome Go Home" w.m. Irving Berlin & Edgar Leslie
- "She Was A Dear Little Girl" w. Irving Berlin m. Ted Snyder
- "Ship Ahoy!" w.m. A. J. Mills & Bennett Scott
- "Stop That Rag (Keep On Playing, Honey)" Irving Berlin, Ted Snyder
- "Take Me Up With You, Dearie" w. Junie McCree m. Albert Von Tilzer
- "Temptation Rag" m. Henry Lodge
- "That Mesmerizing Mendelssohn Tune" w.m. Irving Berlin
- "That's A Plenty" w. Henry Creamer m. Bert A. Williams
- "When I Dream In The Gloaming Of You" w.m. Herbert Ingraham
- "When You First Kissed The Last Girl You Loved" w. Will M. Hough & Frank R. Adams m. Joseph E. Howard
- "Where My Caravan Has Rested" w. Edward Teschemacher m. Herman Lohr
- "The Whiffenpoof Song" w. Meade Minnigerode & George S. Pomeroy m. Tod B. Galloway
- "The White Wash Man" w. William Jerome m. Jean Schwartz
- "Wild Cherries (Coony, Spoony Rag)" Irving Berlin, Ted Snyder
- "Yiddle On Your Fiddle" w.m. Irving Berlin
- "You Taught Me How To Love You Now Teach Me To Forget" w. Jack Drislane & Alfred Bryan m. George W. Meyer

== Recorded popular music ==
Shine On, Harvest Moon
1909 Edison Records recording of husband-and-wife team Jack Norworth and Nora Bayes' 1908 hit Shine On, Harvest Moon with Ada Jones and Billy Murray.

- "Beautiful Eyes, Beautiful Lies" – Ada Jones
- "Believe Me, If All Those Endearing Young Charms" – Nellie Melba
- "Black And White Rag", recorded by
  - Victor Dance Orchestra
  - Prince's Band
- "By The Light Of The Silvery Moon" – Billy Murray and Haydn Quartette
- "Carrie (Carrie Marry Harry)" – Billy Murray
- "College Life" – Billy Murray
- "Dill Pickles Rag" – Pryor's Band
- "Down Among The Sugar Cane" – Collins and Harlan
- "Down In Jungle Town" – Peter Dawson (as Charles Handy)
- "Face To Face" – Frank C. Stanley
- "Good Evening, Caroline" – Billy Murray
- "Has Anybody Here Seen Kelly?" – Florrie Forde
- "I Couldn't Hear Nobody Pray" – Fisk University Jubilee Quartet
- "I Do Like To Be Beside The Seaside", recorded by:
  - Mark Sheridan
  - Florrie Forde
- "I Just Came Back To Say Good Bye" – Amy Butler
- "I Love My Wife, But Oh, You Kid" – Billy Murray
- "I Wonder Who's Kissing Her Now" – Billy Murray
- "If The Wind Had Only Blown The Other Way" – Grace Cameron
- "I'm A Member Of The Midnight Crew" – Eddie Morton
- "I'm Going To Do What I Please" – Stella Tobin
- "I've Got Rings On My Fingers", recorded by:
  - Ada Jones
  - Blanche Ring
- "Just Before The Battle, Mother" – Will Oakland
- "Let's Go Into A Picture Show", recorded by:
  - Harry Tally with orchestra directed by Walter B. Rogers
  - Pete Murray
- "The Longest Way 'Round Is The Sweetest Way Home" – Will Oakland
- "Maple Leaf Rag" – United States Marine Band (popular remake by the U.S.M.B. of their historic 1906 recording)
- "Meet Me In Rose-Time, Rosie" – Peter Dawson (as Mr C. Handy)
- "My Pony Boy" – Ada Jones & Peerless Quartette
- "My Wife's Gone To The Country" – Collins & Harlan
- "Not For Me" – Bessie Wynn
- "Now I Have To Call Him Father" – Florrie Forde
- "Oh You Kid!" – Billy Murray & Ada Jones
- "Oh! You Candy Kid" – Ada Jones
- "Oh, Dem Golden Slippers" – Fisk University Jubilee Quartet
- "Old Black Joe" – Fisk University Jubilee Quartet
- "Put Me Upon An Island" – Wilkie Bard
- "Put on Your Old Grey Bonnet" – Haydn Quartette
- "Rainbow" – Frank C. Stanley and Henry Burr
- "She Sells Sea-Shells" – Billy Murray
- "The Star Spangled Banner" – Geraldine Farrar w. male chorus (Harry Macdonough, Reed Miller, Reinald Werrenrath and Frank C. Stanley)
- "Sweet Simplicitas" – Peter Dawson (as Charles Handy) w. Chorus (Ernest Pike, Harold Wilde and Stewart Gardner)
- "Swing Low, Sweet Chariot" – Fisk University Jubilee Quartet
- "Take Me Up With You, Dearie" – Billy Murray and Haydn Quartet
- "That's A Plenty" – Arthur Collins
- "When I Dream In The Gloaming Of You", recorded by:
  - Harry Tally with Prince's Orchestra
  - Walter Van Brunt
- "The Whole Damm Family" – Billy Murray
- "The Yama Yama Man" – Ada Jones
- "Yankiana Rag" – The American Symphony Orchestra
- "Ye Banks And Braes O' Bonnie Doon" – Nellie Melba
- "Yip-I-Addy-I-Ay!", recorded by:
  - George Grossmith Jr.
  - Blanche Ring with orchestra directed by Walter B. Rogers

== Classical music ==
- Arnold Bax – In the Faery Hills
- Ferruccio Busoni – An die Jugend
- Alfredo Casella - Symphony No. 2, Op. 12
- George Enescu – Piano Quartet No. 1 in D major, Op. 16
- Gustav Helsted – Concerto for Violin and Orchestra in B minor
- Anatoly Lyadov – Kikimora, Op. 63
- John Blackwood McEwen – A Solway Symphony
- Gustav Mahler (completed)
  - Das Lied von der Erde
  - Symphony No. 9
- Nikolai Medtner – Violin Sonata No.1, Op. 21
- Adolf Mišek – Sonata for Double Bass and Piano no 1 in A major
- Max Reger –
  - Psalm 100, op. 106
  - Clarinet Sonata No. 3, op. 107
  - String Quartet No. 4, op. 109
- Arnold Schoenberg –
  - "Am Strande", for voice and piano
  - Drei Klavierstücke, Op. 11
  - Erwartung, monodrama in one act, Op. 17
  - Five Pieces for Orchestra, Op. 16
- Cyril Scott – Piano Sonata No.1, Op. 66
- Jean Sibelius – Voces intimae
- Igor Stravinsky – Pogrebal’naya Pesnya
- Sergei Taneyev – Suite de concert for Violin and Orchestra
- Charles Tournemire – Symphony No. 2 (Ouessant)
- Anton Webern –
  - Fünf Lieder for voice and piano, Op. 4
  - Five Movements for String Quartet, Op. 5

== Opera ==
- Jules Massenet – Bacchus (opera)
- Ruperto Chapí – Margarita la tornera (Margarita the Gatekeeper)
- Nikolai Rimsky-Korsakov – The Golden Cockerel
- Richard Strauss – Elektra
- Ermanno Wolf-Ferrari – Il segreto di Susanna

== Musical theater ==
- The Arcadians London production opened at the Shaftesbury Theatre on April 28 and ran for 809 performances.
- The Beauty Spot Broadway production opened at the Herald Square Theatre on April 10 and ran for 137 performances
- The Belle of Brittany (Music: Howard Talbot & Marie Horne Lyrics: Percy Greenbank Book: P. J. Barron & Leedom Bantock) Broadway production opened at Daly's Theatre on November 8 and ran for 72 performances. Starring Frank Daniels and Frances Kennedy.
- A Broken Idol Broadway production opened at the Herald Square Theatre on August 16 and ran for 40 performances
- The Chocolate Soldier Broadway production opened at the Lyric Theatre on September 13, transferred to the Herald Square Theatre on October 25, transferred back to the Lyric Theatre on November 22 and transferred to the Casino Theatre on December 20 for a total run of 295 performances
- The Dashing Little Duke London production opened at Hicks Theatre on February 17 and ran for 101 performances
- Dear Little Denmark opened at the Prince Of Wales Theatre on September 1 and ran for 109 performances
- The Dollar Princess London production opened at Daly's Theatre on September 25 and ran for 428 performances
- The Dollar Princess Broadway production opened at the Knickerbocker Theatre on August 6 and ran for 250 performances
- Der Graf von Luxemburg (The Count of Luxembourg) Vienna production opened at the Theater an der Wien on November 12 and ran for 299 performances
- Fallen Fairies (Music: Edward German Book & Lyrics W. S. Gilbert) London production opened at the Savoy on 15 December and ran for 51 performances
- The Midnight Sons Broadway production opened at the Broadway Theatre on May 22 and ran for 257 performances
- Our Miss Gibbs (Music: Ivan Caryll & Lionel Monckton Lyrics: Adrian Ross & Percy Greenbank) London production opened at the Gaiety Theatre on January 23 and ran for 636 performances.
- A Persian Princess London production opened at the Queen's Theatre on April 27 and ran for 68 performances.
- Ziegfeld Follies of 1909 Broadway revue opened at the Jardin de Paris on June 14 and ran for 64 performances

== Births ==
- January 3 – Victor Borge, born Børge Rosenbaum, Danish-born comedian, musician and actor (d. 2000)
- January 11 – Gunnar Berg, Swiss-born Danish composer (d. 1989)
- January 13 – Ed Burke, jazz musician (d. 1988)
- January 15 – Gene Krupa, drummer (d. 1973)
- January 21 – Todor Skalovski, Macedonian composer (d. 2004)
- February 5 – Grazyna Bacewicz, Polish composer (d. 1969)
- February 9 – Carmen Miranda, Brazilian singer, actress (d. 1955)
- March 17 – K. P. H. Notoprojo, Javanese musician (d. 2007)
- May 1 – George Melachrino, English conductor, singer and composer (d. 1965)
- May 10 – Maybelle Carter née Addington, American country singer and musician, member of the Carter Family (d. 1978)
- May 13 – Ken Darby, American chorale director (d. 1992)
- May 30 – Benny Goodman, musician, actor (d. 1986)
- June 12 – Archie Bleyer, American arranger and bandleader (d. 1989)
- June 14 – Burl Ives, American folk singer and actor (d. 1995)
- June 26 – Colonel Tom Parker, Elvis Presley's manager (d. 1997)
- July 9 – Manolo Caracol, Andalusian flamenco singer (d. 1973)
- July 18 – Harriet Hilliard, American singer and actress, wife of Ozzie Nelson and mother of Rick Nelson (d. 1994)
- July 22 – Licia Albanese, Italian-born operatic soprano and songwriter (d. 1995)
- August 10 – Claude Thornhill, American bandleader, pianist and composer (d. 1965)
- August 11 – Yuji Koseki, Japanese composer (d. 1989)
- August 13 – Brian Lawrance, Australian bandleader (d. 1983)
- August 15 – Hugo Winterhalter, American conductor and arranger (d. 1973)
- August 17 – Larry Clinton, American bandleader and songwriter (d. 1985)
- August 23 – Ichirō Saitō, Japanese film composer (d. 1979)
- August 25 – Ruby Keeler, dancer, actress (d. 1993)
- September 24 – Carl Sigman, songwriter (d. 2000)
- October 3 – Borney Bergantine, songwriter (d. 1952)
- November 10 – Johnny Marks, American songwriter (d. 1985)
- November 18 – Johnny Mercer, songwriter (d. 1976)
- December 4 – Barbarito Diez, Cuban singer and bandleader (d. 1995)
- December 20 – Vagn Holmboe, Danish composer (d. 1996)
- date unknown – Antonio Mairena, Andalusian flamenco singer (d. 1983)

== Deaths ==
- January 15 – Ernest Reyer, composer and music critic (b. 1823)
- March 21 – Rudolf von Gottschall, lyricist and poet (born 1823)
- March 22 – Gyula Erkel, Hungarian composer, son of Ferenc Erkel
- March 25 – Ruperto Chapí, composer (b. 1851)
- May 6 – Fanny Cerrito, ballet dancer and choreographer (b. 1817)
- May 19 – Isaac Albéniz, Spanish composer (born 1860)
- May 20 – Ernest Hogan, ragtime musician (b. 1865)
- June 1 – Giuseppe Martucci, composer and conductor
- June 7 – P. W. Halton, conductor (b. 1841)
- July 19 – Leopold Rosenfeld, composer (b. 1849)
- August 17 – Richard Hoffman, composer and pianist (b. 1831)
- October 6 – Dudley Buck, organist, composer and music writer (b. 1839)
- October 13 – Julius Ruthardt, violinist and composer (b. 1841)
- November 8 – Charles Bordes, composer (b. 1863)
- November 10 – Ludvig Schytte, Danish composer, pianist and teacher (b. 1848)
- November 16 – Francis Thomé, pianist and composer (b. 1850)
- December 11 – Domenico Salvatori, castrato singer (b. 1855)
- December 15 – Francisco Tárrega, guitarist and composer (b. 1852)
- date unknown
  - August Jaeger, music publisher (b. 1860)
  - Katharine Purvis, lyricist of "When The Saints Go Marching In"
  - Pallavi Seshayyar, Carnatic music composer (b. 1842)
  - Ivan Vsevolozhsky, director of the Imperial Theatres of Russia
