= 1908 in music =

List of years in music	(table)
- … 1898; 1899; 1900; 1901; 1902; 1903; 1904; 1905; 1906; 1907; 1908; 1909; 1910; 1911; 1912; 1913; 1914; 1915; 1916; 1917; 1918 …
- In film 1905 1906 1907 1908 1909 1910 1911 In radio 1905 1906 1907 1908 1909 1910 1911
- Art; Archaeology; Architecture; Literature; Music; Philosophy; Science; +...

This is a list of notable events in music that took place in the year 1908.

== Specific locations ==
- 1908 in Norwegian music

== Specific genres ==
- 1908 in jazz

== Events ==
- January 26 – Sergei Rachmaninoff's Symphony No. 2 receives its première.
- March 15 – Maurice Ravel's Rapsodie espagnole receives its première in Paris.
- April 11 – Spyridon Samaras's opera Rhea is premiered in Florence (Teatro Verdi)
- September 19 – Première of Gustav Mahler's Symphony No. 7 in Prague.
- November 18 – Release in France of the film The Assassination of the Duke of Guise with a score from Saint-Saëns.
- December 3 – Edward Elgar's Symphony No. 1 receives its première in Manchester.
- December 18 – Claude Debussy's Children's Corner receives its première in Paris.
- Anthony Maggio publishes a dance band orchestration of early Blues "I Got The Blues" in New Orleans.
- Opera singer Amelita Galli marries the Marchese Luigi Curci, and acquires the name by which she becomes best-known.
- Claude Debussy marries Emma Bardac.

== Published popular music ==
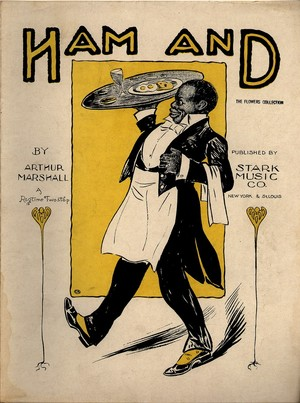

- "The ABCs of the U.S.A." w.m. George M. Cohan from the musical The Yankee Prince
- "All For Love Of You" w. Dave Reed m. Ernest R. Ball
- "Any Old Port In A Storm" w. Arthur J. Lamb m. Kerry Mills
- "Black And White Rag" w.m. George Botsford
- "Consolation" by Edward Madden
- "Cuddle Up A Little Closer, Lovey Mine" w. Otto Harbach m. Karl Hoschna
- "Daisies Won't Tell" w.m. Anita Owen
- "Down Among The Sugar Cane" w. Avery & Charles Hart m. Cecil Mack & Chris Smith
- "Down In Jungle Town" w. Edward Madden m. Theodore F. Morse
- "The Fairest Of The Fair" w.m. John Philip Sousa
- "Feed The Kitty" w. Ed Moran m. J. Fred Helf
- "Fig Leaf Rag" by Scott Joplin
- "Golliwog's Cake Walk" m. Claude Debussy
- "Good Evening, Caroline" by Albert Von Tilzer & Jack Norworth
- "Ham And !" by Arthur Marshall
- "Has Anybody Here Seen Kelly?" w.m. C. W. Murphy & Will Letters. With new lyrics by William McKenna it was performed by Nora Bayes in the 1910 Broadway production of the musical The Jolly Bachelors
- "I Hear You Calling Me" w. Harold Harford (actual name Harold Lake) m. Charles Marshall
- "If I Had A Thousand Lives To Live" w. Sylvester Maguire m. Alfred Solman
- "I'm A Yiddish Cowboy" w. Edgar Leslie m. Al Piantodosi & Halsey K. Mohr
- "I'm Glad I'm Married" w. Jack Norworth m. Albert Von Tilzer
- "I'm Looking For The Man That Wrote "The Merry Widow Waltz"" w. Edgar Selden m. Seymour Furth
- "In The Garden Of My Heart" w. Caro Roma m. Ernest R. Ball
- "It's The Pretty Things You Say" w. Alfred Bryan m. Ted Snyder
- "I've Taken Quite A Fancy To You" w. Edward Madden m. Theodore F. Morse
- "Kerry Mills' Barn Dance" w. Thurland Chattaway m. Kerry Mills
- "The Longest Way 'Round Is The Sweetest Way Home" w. Ren Shields m. Kerry Mills
- "Love Is Like A Cigarette" w. Glen MacDonough m. Victor Herbert
- "Love Me Like I Want To Be Loved" w. Earle C. Jones & Alfred Bryan m. George W. Meyer
- "Love's Roundelay" w. Joseph Herbert m. Oscar Straus
- "Make A Noise Like A Hoop And Roll Away" w. Ren Shields m. J. Fred Helf
- "Meet Me In Rose-Time, Rosie" w. William Jerome m. Jean Schwartz
- "Mother Hasn't Spoken To Father Since" w. William Jerome m. Jean Schwartz
- "My Brudda Sylvest'" w. Jesse Lasky m. Fred Fisher
- "My Girl's A Yorkshire Girl" w.m. C. W. Murphy & Dan Lipton
- "Now I Have To Call Him Father" w.m. Charles Collins & Fred Godfrey
- "The Old Time Rag" w. Edward Madden m. Theodore Morse
- "Pine Apple Rag" by Scott Joplin
- "Shine On Harvest Moon" w. Jack Norworth m. Nora Bayes & Jack Norworth
- "A Singer Sang A Song" w. Will Heelan m. Seymour Furth
- "Smarty" w. Jack Norworth m. Albert Von Tilzer
- "Sun Bird m. Kerry Mills
- "Sweetest Gal In Town" w.m. Bob Cole & J. Rosamond Johnson
- "Sweetest Maid Of All" w. Joseph Herbert m. Oscar Straus
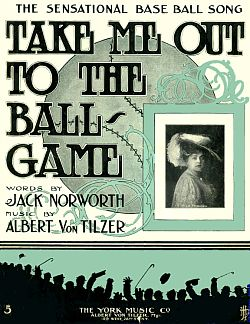
- "Take Me Out to the Ball Game" w. Jack Norworth m. Albert Von Tilzer
- "Up In A Balloon" w. Ren Shields m. Percy Wenrich
- "When Highland Mary Danced The Highland Fling" w. Jack Mahoney m. Harry Von Tilzer
- "When It's Moonlight On The Prairie" w. Robert F. Roden m. S. R. Henry
- "When We Are M-A-Double-R-I-E-D" w.m. George M. Cohan from the musical Fifty Miles From Boston
- "The Whitewash Man" w. William Jerome m. Jean Schwartz
- "The Yama Yama Man" w. Collin Davis m. Karl Hoschna
- "Yip-I-Addy-I-Ay!" w. Will D. Cobb m. John H. Flynn
- "You Will Have To Sing An Irish Song" w. Jack Norworth m. Albert Von Tilzer
- "You're In The Right Church, But The Wrong Pew" w. Cecil Mack m. Chris Smith

== Hit recordings ==
- " The Small Town Gal" – George M. Cohan
- "All She Gets from the Iceman Is Ice" – Ada Jones

== Classical music ==
- Kurt Atterberg – Rhapsody for Piano and Orchestra
- Béla Bartók – First Violin Concerto
- Alban Berg – Piano Sonata, Op.1
- York Bowen – Viola Concerto in C minor
- Henry Walford Davies – Solemn Melody for organ
- George Enescu –
  - Cantate pour la pose de la prèmiere pierre du pont à transbordeur de Bordeaux, for military band, two harps, string orchestra, solo cello, choir, baritone solo, and cannons
  - "Morgengebet", for voice and piano
  - Sept chansons de Clement Marot, for tenor and piano, Op. 15
- Gabriel Fauré –
  - Nocturne No. 9 in B minor, Op. 97
  - Nocturne No. 10 in E minor, Op. 99
  - Serenade for cello and piano, Op. 98
- Alexander Glazunov - Symphony No. 8
- Reinhold Glière – Second Symphony, Op. 25
- Hamilton Harty – Violin Concerto
- Mikhail Ippolitov-Ivanov – Symphony No. 1
- John Ireland – Phantasy Piano Trio
- Charles Ives –
  - Prelude on Eventide
  - The Unanswered Question
- Paul von Klenau – Symphony No. 1
- Toivo Kuula – Piano Trio
- Gian Francesco Malipiero – Sinfonie del silenzio e della morte
- Erkki Melartin – Third String Quartet
- Carl Nielsen – Saga-Drøm (tone poem)
- Maurice Ravel -
  - Gaspard de la nuit
  - Rapsodie espagnole
- Max Reger –
  - Auferstanden, auferstanden, cantata for SATB soloists, SATB choir, and organ
  - Sonatinas for two pianos (4), Op. 89
  - Suite, for violin and piano, in E minor
  - Trio No. 2, for violin, cello, and piano, Op. 102
  - Violin Concerto, in A major, Op. 101
  - Symphonischer Prolog zu einer Tragödie in A minor, Op. 108
  - Weihegesang, for alto solo, SATB choir, and winds
  - Zwei geistliche Lieder, for choir
- Xaver Scharwenka – Piano Concerto No. 4 in F minor
- Arnold Schoenberg –
  - Lieder (2), Op. 14
  - String Quartet No. 2 – premiered in Vienna
- Alexander Scriabin – The Poem of Ecstasy
- Igor Stravinsky – Feu d'artifice
- May Summerbelle 'Beaux Yeux' Waltz for solo piano
- Anton Webern – Passacaglia for orchestra, Op. 1

== Opera ==
- Paul Le Flem – Aucassin et Nicolette

== Film ==
- Camille Saint-Saëns - La Mort du duc de Guise

== Musical theater ==
- Algeria Broadway production opened at The Broadway Theatre on August 31 and ran for 48 performances
- The Belle of Brittany opened at the Queen's Theatre in London on 24 October 1908 with music by Howard Talbot to a book by Leedham Bantock and lyrics by Percy Greenbank
- The Dollar Princess Manchester production
- Fifty Miles from Boston Broadway production opened on February 3 at the Garrick Theatre and ran for 40 performances
- The King of Cadonia London production opened at the Prince of Wales Theatre on September 3 and ran for 333 performances
- Mr. Hamlet of Broadway Broadway production opened at the Casino Theatre on December 23 and ran for 54 performances
- My Mimosa Maid London production opened at the Prince Of Wales Theatre on April 21 and ran for 83 performances
- Der Tapfere Soldat (The Chocolate Soldier) (Rudolf Friml) Vienna production opened at the Theater an der Wien on November 14 and ran for 62 performances
- The Three Twins opened at the Herald Square Theatre on June 15 and moved to the Majestic Theatre on January 18, 1909, for a total run of 289 performances
- A Waltz Dream London production opened at the Hicks Theatre on March 7 and ran for 146 performances.
- A Waltz Dream Broadway production opened at the Broadway Theatre on January 27 and ran for 111 performances
- The Yankee Prince Broadway production opened at the Knickerbocker Theatre on April 20 and ran for 112 performances
- Ziegfeld Follies Broadway revue opened at the Jardin de Paris on June 15 and ran for 120 performances

== Births ==
- January 7 – Red Allen, jazz musician (d. 1967)
- January 14 – Russ Columbo, singer, bandleader, composer (d. 1934)
- January 16 – Ethel Merman, American singer and actress (d. 1984)
- January 26
  - Stéphane Grappelli, musician, composer (d. 1997)
  - Ernst Oster, pianist, musicologist, and music theorist (d. 1977)
- January 27 – Hot Lips Page, jazz trumpet (d. 1954)
- February 20 – Ruby Elzy, US soprano, first Serena in Porgy and Bess (d. 1943)
- February 29 – A. L. Lloyd, folk song collector (d. 1982)
- March 14 – Nikolai Rakov, Soviet composer (d. 1990)
- March 18 – Ivor Moreton, British singer, composer and pianist (d. 1984)
- April 2 – Buddy Ebsen, US actor and singer (d. 2003)
- April 5 – Herbert von Karajan, Austrian conductor (d. 1989)
- April 7 – Percy Faith, composer, musician (d. 1976)
- April 8 – Tito Guízar, Mexican singer and film actor (d. 1999)
- April 15 – eden ahbez, hermit, musician (d. 1995)
- April 20 – Lionel Hampton, jazz musician, bandleader (d. 2002)
- May 6 – Necil Kazım Akses, Turkish composer (d. 1999)
- May 8 – Cristian Vasile, Romanian tango singer (d. 1985)
- May 15 – Lars-Erik Larsson, Swedish composer (d. 1986)
- May 27 – Harold Rome, US songwriter (d. 1993)
- June 24 – Hugo Distler, organist and composer (d. 1942)
- June 29 – Leroy Anderson, US composer and conductor (d. 1975)
- July 8 – Louis Jordan, bandleader (d. 1975)
- July 22 – Ljerko Spiller, Croat-Argentine violinist (d. 2008)
- July 25 – Semmangudi Srinivasa Iyer, Carnatic vocalist (d. 2003)
- August 1 – Miloslav Kabeláč, composer (d. 1979)
- August 4 – Kurt Eichhorn, conductor (d. 1994)
- August 12 – Nina Makarova, composer (d. 1976)
- August 29 – Orestes López, Cuban bassist, cellist, pianist and composer (d. 1991)
- September 5 - Cecilia Seghizzi, Italian composer
- September 6 – Maria Grinberg, pianist (d. 1978)
- September 7 – Max Kaminsky, US jazz trumpeter (d. 1961)
- September 10 – Raymond Scott, composer, bandleader, and electronic music pioneer (d. 1994)
- September 13 – Mae Questel, US singer (d. 1998)
- September 16 – Chick Bullock, US singer (d. 1981)
- September 25 – Eugen Suchoň, Slovak composer (d. 1993)
- September 30 – David Oistrakh, violinist (d. 1974)
- October 1 – Umar Dimayev, Chechen folk singer (d. 1972)
- October 14 – Allan Jones, actor, singer (d. 1992)
- October 19 – Geirr Tveitt, Norwegian composer (d. 1981)
- October 20 – Stuart Hamblen, US singer, actor and songwriter (d. 1989)
- October 21
  - Harry Stewart, comedian, singer, and songwriter (d. 1956)
  - Howard Ferguson, British composer and musicologist (d. 1999)
- November 19
  - Jean-Yves Daniel-Lesur, French organist and composer (d. 2002)
  - Keg Johnson, US jazz trombonist (d. 1967)
- December 10 – Olivier Messiaen, composer (d. 1992)
- December 11 – Elliott Carter, composer (d. 2012)
- December 16 – Frances Day, US actress and singer (d. 1984)
- December 17 – William Brocklesby Wordsworth, English/Scottish composer and pianist (died 1988)
- December 21 – Gregory Egiazarovich Yeghiazarian, Armenian composer (died 1988)

== Deaths ==
- January 22 – August Wilhelmj, German violinist, 62
- January 23 – Edward MacDowell, American composer (b. 1860)
- February 28 – Pauline Lucca, operatic soprano (b. 1842)
- March 2 – Walter Slaughter, conductor and composer (b. 1860)
- March 12 – Clara Novello, soprano (b. 1818)
- March 26 – Louis Chauvin, ragtime musician (b. 1881)
- April 29 – Auguste Götze, German classical singer and vocal pedagogue (b. 1840)
- May 7 – Ludovic Halévy, lyricist (b. 1834)
- May 12 – Melisio Morales, composer (b. 1838)
- June 5 – Josef Wagner, composer (b. 1856)
- June 20 – Federico Chueca, zarzuela composer (b. 1846)
- June 21 – Nikolai Rimsky-Korsakov, composer (b. 1844)
- July 10 – Phoebe Knapp, composer of hymns (b. 1839)
- July 14 – William Mason, pianist and composer (b. 1829)
- July 18 – Jaime Nunó, composer of Mexico's national anthem (b. 1824)
- August 13 – Ira D. Sankey, gospel singer and composer (b. 1840)
- August 20 – Louisa Bassano, opera singer (b. 1818)
- August 26 – Tony Pastor, vaudeville founder & theater impresario (b. 1837)
- September 20 – Pablo de Sarasate, violinist (b. 1844)
- September 21 – Atanas Badev, composer and music teacher (b. 1860)
- November 15 – Katti Lanner, ballet dancer and choreographer (b. 1829)
- November 20 – Albert Dietrich, conductor and composer (b. 1829)
- date unknown – Alois Kaiser, cantor and composer (b. 1840)
