= Ada Jones discography =

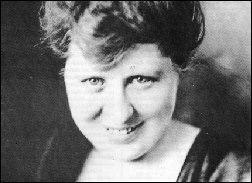
- Singles: 128

This is the discography of Ada Jones, who released a total of 128 hit singles; of those, 20 with Len Spencer, 43 with Billy Murray, one with Billy Murray & Frank Stanley, one with Victor Light Opera Co., one with American Quartet, one with Billy Murray & American Quartet, seven with Walter Van Brunt, two with Peerless Quartet, two with Henry Burr, one with Billy Watkins, two with Will Robbins, one with M.J. O'Connell, one with Cal Stewart, one with Cal Stewart & Peerless Quartet, and 44 solo.

== Discography ==
=== Hit singles ===
Year	Single	Chart positions
Year	Single	US
1905	"My Carolina Lady"	3
1905	"Mr. and Mrs. Murphy" (Ada Jones & Len Spencer)	8
1905	"Heinie" (Ada Jones & Len Spencer)	5
1905	"Ev'ry Little Bit Helps" (Ada Jones & Len Spencer)	4
1905	"Reuben and Cynthia" (Ada Jones & Len Spencer)	8
1905	"Pals" (Ada Jones & Len Spencer)	5
1905	"Just Plain Folks"	3
1905	"Keep a Cozy Little Corner in Your Heart for Me"	5
1905	"Jimmie and Maggie at the Hippodrome" (Ada Jones & Len Spencer)	4
1905	"Please Come and Play in My Yard"	10
1905	"Courtship of Barney and Eileen" (Ada Jones & Len Spencer)	9
1906	"The Golden Wedding" (Ada Jones & Len Spencer)	4
1906	"I'm the Only Star That Twinkles on Broadway"	7
1906	"Fritz and Louisa" (Ada Jones & Len Spencer)	7
1906	"The Original Cohens" (Ada Jones & Len Spencer)	6
1906	"Just a Little Rocking Chair and You"	4
1906	"So Long, Mary"	2
1906	"My Lovin' Henry"	7
1906	"Waiting at the Church (My Wife Won't Let Me)"	2
1906	"Bashful Henry and His Lovin' Lucy" (Ada Jones & Len Spencer)	4
1906	"Peaches and Cream" (Ada Jones & Len Spencer)	3
1906	"Let Me See You Smile" (Ada Jones & Len Spencer)	6
1906	"It's All Right in the Summertime"	4
1906	"The Moon Has His Eyes on You"	6
1906	"Jimmie and Maggie at the Ball Game" (Ada Jones & Len Spencer)	8
1907	"I'm Sorry" (Ada Jones & Billy Murray)	4
1907	"Down on the Farm" (Ada Jones & Len Spencer)	7
1907	"If the Man in the Moon Were a Coon"	3
1907	"Wouldn't You like to Flirt with Me?" (Ada Jones & Billy Murray)	8
1907	"I Just Can't Make My Eyes Behave"	1
1907	"Whistle It" (Ada Jones, Billy Murray & Frank Stanley)	2
1907	"The Game of Peek-a-Boo (I'd like to See a Little More of You)" (Ada Jones & Billy Murray)	3
1907	"My Irish Rosie"	2
1907	"It's Nice to Have a Sweetheart" (Ada Jones & Billy Murray)	3
1907	"Kiss, Kiss, Kiss (If You Want to Learn to Kiss)" (Ada Jones & Billy Murray)	5
1907	"Meet Me Down at the Corner" (Ada Jones & Len Spencer)	7
1907	"Won't You Be My Honey?" (Ada Jones & Billy Murray)	3
1907	"Let's Take an Old-Fashioned Walk" (Ada Jones & Billy Murray)	1
1907	"Herman and Minnie" (Ada Jones & Len Spencer)	7
1907	"Be My Little Teddy Bear" (Ada Jones & Billy Murray)	5
1907	"You've Got to Love Me a Lot" (Ada Jones & Len Spencer)	8
1908	"Make Believe" (Ada Jones & Billy Murray)	3
1908	"Wouldn't You like to Have Me for a Sweetheart?"	6
1908	"I Could Learn to Love You When You Smile, Smile, Smile" (Ada Jones & Billy Murray)	6
1908	"Wouldn't You like to Have Me for a Sweetheart?" (Ada Jones & Billy Murray)	1
1908	"Jimmie and Maggie at The Merry Widow" (Ada Jones & Len Spencer)	5
1908	"When We Are M-A-Double-R-I-E-D" (Ada Jones & Billy Murray)	1
1908	"Smarty" (Ada Jones & Billy Murray)	2
1908	"I Want to Be a Merry, Merry Widow"	6
1908	"Cuddle up a Little Closer, Lovey Mine" (Ada Jones & Billy Murray)	1
1908	"I've Taken Quite a Fancy to You" (Ada Jones & Billy Murray)	2
1908	"The ABCs of the U.S.A." (Ada Jones & Billy Murray)	6
1908	"By the Old Oaken Bucket, Louise" (Ada Jones & Billy Murray)	7
1908	"There's No Moon like the Honeymoon" (Ada Jones & Billy Murray)	3
1909	"I Remember You"	2
1909	"Pet Names" (Ada Jones & Billy Murray)	8
1909	"Oh, You Kid!" (Ada Jones & Billy Murray)	8
1909	"Shine On, Harvest Moon" (Ada Jones & Billy Murray)	1
1909	"I'm Looking for a Sweetheart and I Think You'll Do" (Ada Jones & Billy Murray)	5
1909	"Beautiful Eyes"	2
1909	"The Yama Yama Man" (Ada Jones & Victor Light Opera Co.)	1
1909	"Isn't Love a Grand Old Thing?" (Ada Jones & Billy Murray)	6
1909	"I'm Awfully Glad I Met You" (Ada Jones & Billy Murray)	3
1909	"My Pony Boy"	2
1909	"Mister Othello"	9
1909	"I've Got Rings On My Fingers"	1
1909	"Red Head"	5
1909	"I'm Glad I'm a Boy - I'm Glad I'm a Girl" (Ada Jones & Billy Murray)	6
1910	"Oh, You Candy Kid"	6
1910	"Has Anybody Here Seen Kelly?"	4
1910	"Emmaline" (Ada Jones & Billy Murray)	2
1910	"What Makes the World Go Round" (Ada Jones & Billy Murray)	3
1910	"By the Light of the Silvery Moon"	2
1910	"Just a Little Ring from You" (Ada Jones & Billy Murray)	8
1910	"Call Me Up Some Rainy Afternoon" (Ada Jones & American Quartet)	1
1910	"The Girl with a Brogue"	7
1910	"Call Me Up Some Rainy Afternoon"	4
1910	"Return of the Arkansas Traveler" (Ada Jones & Len Spencer)	9
1910	"Is There Anything Else I Can Do for You?"	9
1911	"Silver Bell" (Ada Jones & Billy Murray)	7
1911	"Kiss Me, My Honey, Kiss Me" (Ada Jones & Billy Murray)	5
1911	"Come, Josephine, in My Flying Machine" (Ada Jones, Billy Murray & American Quartet)	1
1911	"The Dublin Rag"	9
1911	"Cheer Up, My Honey" (Ada Jones & Billy Murray)	7
1911	"All Aboard for Blanket Bay"	4
1911	"Put Your Arms Around Me, Honey"	5
1911	"Any Little Girl, That's a Nice Girl Is the Right Little Girl for Me"	8
1911	"It's Got to Be Someone I Love" (Ada Jones & Walter Van Brunt)	9
1911	"That was Before I Met You" (Ada Jones & Walter Van Brunt)	6
1911	"All Alone" (Ada Jones & Billy Murray)	2
1911	"All Alone" (Ada Jones & Walter Van Brunt)	6
1911	"Knock Wood" (Ada Jones & Walter Van Brunt)	5
1911	"They Always Pick on Me"	7
1912	"Knock Wood" (Ada Jones & Billy Murray)	9
1912	"Ring Ting a Ling"	7
1912	"Bring Back My Lovin' Man"	5
1912	"Lingering Love" (Ada Jones & Billy Murray)	8
1912	"I'm Afraid, Pretty Maid, I'm Afraid" (Ada Jones & Walter Van Brunt)	3
1912	"Oh Mr. Dream Man (Please Let Me Dream Some More)" / "Come Out And Shine, Mr. Moon" (Zonophone 938; both 1909 recordings)	7
1912	"Whistle It" (Ada Jones & Peerless Quartet)	6
1912	"Be My Little Baby Bumble Bee" (Ada Jones & Billy Murray)	1
1912	"The Wedding Glide" (Ada Jones & Billy Murray)	4
1912	"Be My Little Baby Bumble Bee" (Ada Jones & Walter Van Brunt)	6
1913	"Row! Row! Row!"	1
1913	"I've Got the Finest Man"	9
1913	"When I Get You Alone To-Night" (Ada Jones & Walter Van Brunt)	8
1913	"All Night Long" (Ada Jones & Billy Murray)	7
1913	"On the Old Front Porch" (Ada Jones & Billy Murray)	6
1914	"On the Old Front Porch" (Ada Jones & Henry Burr)	9
1914	"All Aboard for Dixie Land" (Ada Jones & Peerless Quartet)	3
1914	"Where Can I Meet You To-Night?" (Ada Jones & Henry Burr)	9
1914	"I'm Crying Just for You" (Ada Jones & Billy Murray)	4
1914	"By the Beautiful Sea" (Ada Jones & Billy Watkins)	1
1914	"The Whistling Coquette" (Ada Jones & Billy Murray)	10
1915	"If That's Your Idea of a Wonderful Time (Take Me Home)"	10
1915	"She Used to Be the Slowest Girl in Town" (Ada Jones & Will Robbins)	10
1915	"My Little Girl" (Ada Jones & Will Robbins)	7
1916	"Beatrice Fairfax, Tell Me What to Do!"	6
1916	"If I Knock the "L" Out of Kelly"	9
1917	"O'Brien Is Tryin' to Learn to Talk Hawaiian"	9
1917	"What Do You Want to Make Those Eyes at Me For?" (Ada Jones & Billy Murray)	3
1917	"Put On Your Slippers & Fill Up Your Pipe (You're Not Going Bye-Bye Tonight)"	10
1917	"M-I-S-S-I-S-S-I-P-P-I"	9
1917	"Some Sunday Morning" (Ada Jones & M.J. O'Connell)	4
1918	"I'll Take You Back to Italy" (Ada Jones & Billy Murray)	9
1919	"Uncle Josh and Aunt Nancy Put Up the Kitchen Stove" (Ada Jones & Cal Stewart)	5
1919	"Christmas Time at Pumpkin Center" (Ada Jones, Cal Stewart & Peerless Quartet)	7
1922	"When Frances Dances with Me" (Ada Jones & Billy Murray)	6

== See also ==
- List of songs recorded by Ada Jones
