= List of songs recorded by Ada Jones =

This is an alphabetical list of songs recorded by Ada Jones.

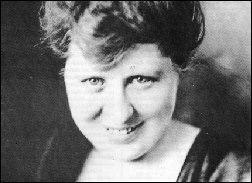
Ada Jones

== A ==
- "All Aboard for Blanket Bay" (1911)
- "All She Gets from the Iceman Is Ice" (1908) [Edison]
- "All She Gets from the Iceman Is Ice" (1908) [Victor]
- "Any Little Girl that's a Nice Little Girl Is the Right Little Girl for Me" (1911)
- "Arab Love Song" (1909)

== B ==
- "Barney McGee" (1909)
- "Beatrice Fairfax, Tell Me What to Do" (1916)
- "Beautiful Eyes" (1909) [Columbia]
- "Beautiful Eyes" (1909) [Indestructible]
- "Bedtime at the Zoo" (1914)
- "Before I Go and Marry, I Will Have a Word with You" (1910)
- "The Bullfrog and the Coon" (1907)
- "By the Light of the Silvery Moon" (1909) [Indestructible]
- "By the Light of the Silvery Moon" (1910) [Edison]

== C ==
- "Call Me Up Some Rainy Afternoon" (1910)
- "Can't You See I'm Lonely" (1905)
- "Come Over Here, It's a Wonderful Place" (1917)
- "Cross My Heart and Hope to Die" (1917)
- "Come Josephine In My Flying Machine" (1911)

"Come Out And Shine, Mr. Moon" (1909, issued 1912 on Zonophone 938)

== D ==
- "Don't Get Married Any More, Ma" (1906) [Indestructible]
- "Don't Get Married Any More, Ma" (1907) [Edison]
- "Don't Get Married Any More, Ma" (1907) [Victor]
- "Down in Gossip Row" (1912)

== F ==
- Fraidy Cat (1910)

== G ==
- Games of Childhood Days (1909)
- Goodbye Alexander (World War I Song) (1918)
- Goodbye Molly Brown (1909)
- Grand Baby or Baby Grand (1913)

== H ==
- Has Anybody Here Seen Kelly (1910)
- Have You Seen My Henry Brown (1906)
- He Lost Her in the Subway (1907)
- He Never Even Said Goodbye (1907)
- He's Me Pal (1910)
- He's the Makin's of a Dam'd Fine Man (1916)

== I ==
- I Just Can't Make My Eyes Behave (1907)
- I Miss You Honey, Miss You All the Time (1910)
- I Remember You (1909)
- I Should Worry and Get Wrinkles (1913)
- I Want to Be a Merry Merry Widow (1908)
- If I Knock the L Out of Kelly (1916)
- If That's Your Idea of a Wonderful Time (1915)
- If the Man in the Moon Were a Coon (1907) [Victor]
- If the Man in the Moon Were a Coon (1907) [Columbia]
- If They'ed Only Move Old Ireland Over Here (1914)
- I'm in Love With the Slide Trombone (1907)
- I'm Looking for a Nice Young Fellow Who Is Looking for a Nice Young Girl (1911)
- I'm the Only Star that Twinkles on Broadway (1906)
- Irish Blood (1910) [Edison]
- Irish Blood (1910) [Indestructible]
- Is There Anything Else I Can Do For You (1910)
- It's Got to Be Someone I Love (1911) [Victor]
- It's Got to Be Someone I Love (1913) [Edison]
- I've Got Rings on My Fingers (1909) [Indestructible]
- I've Got Rings on My Fingers (1909) [Columbia]
- I've Got the Finest Man (1913)

== J ==
- Just Plain Folks (1911) [Columbia]
- Just Plain Folks (1913) [Edison]

== M ==
- Mister Othello (1909)
- Mother May I Go in For a Swim (1915)
- My Carolina Lady (1905)
- My Hula Hula Love (1911)
- My Irish Rose (1907)
- My Pony Boy (1909)

== N ==
- Nix on the Glow Worm, Lena (1910)
- Now I Have to Call Him Father (1909)

== O ==
- Oh, Mr. Dream Man, Please Let Me Dream Some More (1912)
- Oh, You Blondy! (1910)
- Oh, You Candy Kid (1909)
- Oh, What I Know About You (1910)
- Out of a City of Six Million People, Why Did You Pick on Me (1916)

== P ==
- Poor John (1907) [Edison]
- Poor John (1907) [Victor]
- Put on Your Slippers and Fill Up Your Pipe, You're Not Going Bye-Bye Tonight (1917) [Victor]
- Put on Your Slippers and Fill Up Your Pipe, You're Not Going Bye-Bye Tonight (1917) [Edison]
- Put on Your Slippers, You're in for the Night (1911)
- Put Your Arms Around Me Honey (1913) [Edison]

== R ==
- Red Head (1909)
- Ring Ting-a-ling (1912)
- Row! Row! Row! (1913)

== S ==
- Seesaw (1908)
- She Forgot to Bring Him Back (1907) [Indestructible]
- She Forgot to Bring Him Back (1908) [Edison]
- She Forgot to Bring Him Back (1908) [Victor]
- So Long Mary (1906)
- Some Boy (1913)
- Somebody Loves You (1913)
- Somebody's Coming To My House (1913) [Edison]
- Sweet Marie (1893)

== T ==
- That Dublin Rag (1911)
- They Always Pick On Me (1911)
- Tickle Toes (1910)
- Top of the Morning (Bridget McCue) (1911)

== W ==
- Waiting at the Church (My Wife Won't Let Me) (1906)
- We've Kept the Golden Rule (1911)
- When Grandma Was a Girl (????)
- Whistle and I'll Wait for You (1909)
- Whistling Jim (1913)
- Wilhelm, the Grocer (1913)
- Willie's Got Another Girl Now (1909)
- Woman of Importance (1906)
- Wouldn't You Like to Have Me for a Sweetheart (1907)

== Y ==
- The Yama Yama Man (1909)
- You Can Look and You Can Listen (1908) [Indestructible]
- You Can Look and You Can Listen (1909) [Victor]
- You Can Tango, You Can Trot, Dear but Be Sure and Hesitate (1914)
- You Will Have to Sing an Irish Song (1908) [Victor]
- You Will Have to Sing an Irish Song (1911) [Columbia]
- Ypsilanti (1915)

== Ada Jones with Len Spencer ==
- Becky and Izzy (A Yiddish Courtship) (1907)
- Blondy and Her Johnny (1907)
- Bronco Bob and His Little Cheyenne (1907) [Edison]
- Bronco Bob and His Little Cheyenne (1907) [United]
- Cherry Hill Jerry (1907)
- Chimmie and Maggie at the Hippodrome (1905)
- Chimmie and Maggie in Nickel Land (1907)
- Coming Home from Coney Island (1906)
- A Coon Courtship (1907)
- The Courtship of Barney and Eileen (1905)
- Dance Hall Scene (1907)
- A Darktown Courtship (Bashful Henry and Lovin' Lucy) (1906) [Columbia]
- A Darktown Courtship (Bashful Henry and Lovin' Lucy) (1906) [Victor]
- Down on the Farm (1906)
- The Fair Fisher and Her Catch (1905)
- Flannigan St. Patrick's Day (1906)
- Fritzy and Louisa (1906) [Edison]
- Fritzy and Louisa (1906) [Victor]
- Fritzy and Louisa (1906) [Silvertone]
- Fun at the Music Counter (1908)
- The Golden Wedding (1905) [Edison 9148]
- The Golden Wedding (1906) [Columbia]
- The Golden Wedding (1906) [Victor]
- The Golden Wedding (1912) [Edison 1871]
- Henry and Hilda at the Schuetzenfest (1908)
- Henry's Return (1907)
- Herman & Minnie (1907)
- House Cleaning Time (1908) [Edison]
- House Cleaning Time (1908) [Victor]
- House Cleaning Time (1908) [Indestructible]
- How Matt Got the Mitten (1907)
- Italian Specialty (1906)
- Jim Jackson's Last Farewell (1906)
- Jimmie and Maggie at the Hippodrome (1905)
- Katrina's Valentine (1905)
- Krausmeyer Taking the Census (1910)
- Let Me See You Smile (1906)
- Louis and Lena (About Luna Park in Coney Island) (1905)
- Maggie Clancy's New Piano (1906)
- Mandy and Her Man (1906)
- Meet Me Down at the Corner (1907) [Edison]
- Meet Me Down at the Corner (1907) [Victor]
- Mr. and Mrs. Murphy (1905)
- Muggsy's Dream (1908)
- The Original Cohens (1906)
- Peaches and Cream (1906) [Victor]
- Peaches and Cream (1913) [Edison]
- Rudolph and Rosie at the Roller Rink (1908)
- Sadie and Abie (1906)
- Santiago Flynn (A Spanish-Irish Episode) (1907)
- Schoolday Frolics (1907)
- Si Perkins' Barn Dance (1909) [Victor]
- Si Perkins' Barn Dance (1914) [Edison]
- Sweet Peggy Magee (1909) [Victor]
- Sweet Peggy Magee (1917) [Edison]
- The Widow Dooley (1908)

== Ada Jones with Walter Van Brunt ==
- All Alone (1911)
- Billy, Billy, Bounce Your Baby Doll (1913)
- Come Along My Mandy (1910)
- Come Josephine in My Flying Machine (1911)
- Emmaline (1910)
- I Live Uptown (1912)
- I'll Sit Right on the Moon (1912)
- I'm Afraid, Pretty Maid, I'm Afraid (1912)
- It's Got to Be Someone I Love (1911)
- It's Nice to Be Nice, to a Nice Little Girl Like You (1911)
- I've Got to Make Love to Somebody (1909)
- My Little Lovin' Sugar Babe (1912)
- Oh What a Night (1913)
- Take Me on a Honeymoon (1909)
- That Was Before I Met You (1911)
- When I Get You Alone Tonight (1913)
- When Sunday Rolls Around (1911)
- You're My Baby (1912)

== Ada Jones with Will C. Robbins ==
- He'd Keep on Saying Good Night (1914)
- If You Can't Get a Girl in the Summertime (1915)
- My Little Girl (1915)
