= Carl W. Stalling =

American composer (1891–1972)

Background information
- Also known as: Arch B. Fritz
- Born: Carl William Stalling; November 10, 1891; Lexington, Missouri, U.S.
- Died: November 29, 1972 (aged 81) Los Angeles, California, U.S.
- Genres: Film score; soundtrack
- Occupations: Composer; arranger
- Instruments: Piano; theater organ
- Years active: 1928–1958

Carl William Stalling (November 10, 1891 – November 29, 1972) was an American composer, voice actor and arranger for music in animated films. He is most closely associated with the Looney Tunes and Merrie Melodies shorts produced by Warner Bros. Cartoons, where he averaged one complete score each week, for 22 years.

== Life and career ==
Stalling was born to Ernest and Sophia C. Stalling. His parents were from Germany; his father arrived in the United States in 1883. The family settled in Lexington, Missouri where his father was a carpenter. He started playing piano at six. By the age of 12, he was the principal piano accompanist in his hometown's silent movie house. For a short period, he was also the theatre organist at the St. Louis Theater.

By his early 20s, he was conducting his own orchestra and improvising on the organ at the Isis Movie Theatre in Kansas City. His actual job at the time was to play organ accompaniment for silent films. During that time, he met and befriended a young Walt Disney, who was producing animated comedy shorts in Kansas City. According to music critic Neil Strauss, the chance meeting between Stalling and Disney in the early 1920s was of great importance to the development of music for animation. Stalling was at his job at the Isis Movie Theatre, demonstrating his ability to combine well-known music by other creators with his own, improvised compositions. Disney stepped into the movie theater and was reportedly impressed with his style. He approached Stalling to introduce himself, and their acquaintance was mutually beneficial. Stalling was able to arrange the screening of a few Disney animated shorts at the Isis, and Disney ensured that Stalling would play the accompaniment for his films.

Disney eventually left Kansas City and moved to California to open a new studio. Stalling and Disney kept in touch through correspondence, and considered each other friends. In 1928, Disney was on a journey from California to New York City to record the sound and make the preview of Steamboat Willie, Disney's first released sound short. During the journey he stopped at Kansas City to hire Stalling to compose film scores for two other animated shorts. Stalling composed several early cartoon scores for Walt Disney, including Plane Crazy and The Gallopin' Gaucho in 1928 (but not Steamboat Willie). Plane Crazy and The Gallopin' Gaucho were originally silent films and were the first two Mickey Mouse animated short films in production.

When finishing composing the film scores, Stalling went to New York City to record them for Disney. Walt was apparently pleased with the results, and offered to hire Stalling as Walt Disney Animation Studios's first music director. In order to get the job, Stalling had to move to California, where the studio was located. According to Martha Sigall, Stalling accepted because the job offer was a great opportunity for him. He probably realized that his career as an organist for a silent movie theatre was coming to an end, because the silent film era was also at its end. Sound films were the new trend. Stalling soon followed Disney in moving to Hollywood, in order to work for his friend. Animation historian Allan Charles Neuwirth credits Stalling for basically inventing the process of creating a film score for cartoons. According to Strauss, the "wildly talented" Stalling was suitable as a film score composer for animated films. Stalling even voiced Mickey Mouse in The Karnival Kid in 1929.

Stalling encouraged Disney to create a new series of animated short films, in which the animation and its action would be created to match the music. This was still unusual at the time, since film music was played or composed to match the action of a film. Stalling's discussions with Disney on whether the animation or the musical score should come first led to Disney creating the Silly Symphonies series of animated short films. Stalling is credited with both the composition and the musical arrangement of The Skeleton Dance (1929), the first of the Silly Symphonies. These cartoons allowed Stalling to create a score that Disney handed to his animators. The Silly Symphonies was an innovative animated film series, in which pre-recorded film scores were making use of well-known classical works and the animation sequences were choreographed to match the music. Stalling helped Disney streamline and update the sound process used in creating early animated sound films, following the long and laborious synchronization process used in Steamboat Willie. The close synchronization of music and on-screen movement pioneered by the Disney short films became known as Mickey Mousing.

While working at the Disney studio, Stalling further refined a forerunner to the click track, they called the "Tick-system". Initially, Wilfred Jackson utilized a Metronome to set a definitive tempo of the cartoon sections, that then got further developed over the years (being transcribed onto a "bar-sheet" or a "dope-sheet"). The system helped synchronize music and sound effects to the visuals. An early example of a click track was used in the production of The Skeleton Dance (1929). The method used in this film involved a reel of unexposed film with holes punched out to make clicks and pops when run on the sound head. According to Strauss, this version of the click track is credited to sound effects artist Jimmy MacDonald.

Stalling left Disney after two years, at the same time as animator Ub Iwerks. He had reportedly completed the scoring of about 20 animated films for Disney. Finding few outlets in New York, Stalling rejoined Iwerks at Animated Pictures Corp. in California, while freelancing for Disney and others. Stalling used the pseudonym Arch B. Fritz while moonlighting for independent studios like Boyd La Vero's studio. Stalling was stated to be part of Disney's music unit in 1932 despite his departure, likely due to his freelance work for Three Little Pigs (1933). Stalling served as the music director of Iwerks' studio until the studio shut down in 1936. In 1936, when Leon Schlesinger—under contract to produce animated shorts for Warner Bros. Pictures—hired Iwerks, Stalling went with him to become a full-time cartoon music composer. According to Sigall, Stalling was hired by the Leon Schlesinger studio in July, 1936. She recalled the month because she was hired by the studio as an apprentice painter that same month. Schlesinger was aware of Stalling's reputation when offering to hire him. Stalling had been recommended to Schlesinger by storyman Ben Hardaway. Hardaway had met Stalling while they both worked at Animated Pictures Corp. and, when Schlesinger started searching for a new music director for his studio, Hardaway suggested hiring his old colleague who was available. According to Sigall, the hiring of Stalling turned out to be a smart move for Schlesinger. The new music director (Stalling) became an integral member of the team producing two very successful animated series.

The two animated series which Schlesinger produced for Warner Bros. were the Looney Tunes and Merrie Melodies, both introduced in the early 1930s. Prior to 1936, most of the animated films of these two series included film scores by either Frank Marsales, Bernard B. Brown, or Norman Spencer. From 1936 onward, Stalling was the film score composer for almost every theatrical animated short released by Warner Bros. Cartoons until his retirement. Stalling served as the music director for this studio for 22 years and is credited for the film score of over 600 animated films.

Like his predecessors as music director for the studio, Stalling had full access to the expansive Warner Bros. catalog and musicians. He could also use the fifty-piece orchestra of the company, headed at the time by Leo F. Forbstein. The executives at Warner Bros. in fact insisted that Stalling should use as much music and songs from their feature films as possible. Their dual goal was to help promote the animated shorts by associating them with already popular music, and to help promote the songs themselves by giving them additional publicity. They hoped that such cross promotion would increase the sales of the songs.

Stalling remained with Warner Bros. until he retired in 1958. His last cartoon was To Itch His Own, directed by Chuck Jones. Following Stalling's retirement, he was succeeded by Milt Franklyn, who had assisted Stalling as an arranger since the mid-1930s and was promoted to musical director in the early 1950s. Stalling and Franklyn had shared credits for musical direction during the last years of Stalling's tenure.

Stalling died in the Los Angeles area on November 29, 1972.

== Composing style ==
Although Stalling's composing technique followed the conventions of music accompaniment from the silent film era that were based on improvisation and compilation of musical cues from catalogs and cue-sheets, he was also an innovator. Stalling is among the first music directors to extensively use the metronome to time film scores. He was one of three composers, along with Max Steiner and Scott Bradley, credited with the invention of the click track.

His stock-in-trade was the "musical pun", where he used references to popular songs, or even classical pieces, to add a dimension of humor to the action on the screen. Working with directors Tex Avery, Bob Clampett, Friz Freleng, Robert McKimson and Chuck Jones, he developed the Looney Tunes style of very rapid and tightly coordinated musical cues, punctuated with both instrumental and recorded sound effects, and occasionally reaching into full blown musical fantasies such as Rabbit of Seville and A Corny Concerto.

Stalling's working process involved meeting each animated short film's director or directors before the animation process began. Together they set the time signatures to which the short was to be drawn. The animators of the film were measuring animation frames per beat. After the animation process was completed, Stalling would receive the animators' exposure sheets or bar sheets. The sheets broke the animation, dialogue, and sound effects into musical bars, which Stalling would then use to create his score for the film.

When working on a film score, Stalling would incorporate his musical puns. He chose popular songs whose titles fit the on-screen gags. His music quotations were often brief, sometimes not lasting more than four seconds. John Zorn has described Stalling's sense for quotation as "Ivesian", in reference to composer Charles Ives and his innovative musical quotation techniques. His musical cues, the unedited periods between the commencement and end of a single musical take, had varying lengths. At the short end of the spectrum, they would last no more than two seconds. At the long end, they would last two minutes. Stalling would often use music quotations from the themes of the live-action films released by Warner Bros. Pictures.

Most of his film scores involved 500 measures in ten sections. His compositions were performed by Warner Bros.' fifty-piece orchestra. Neil Strauss notes that this orchestra was often employed for relatively undemanding film scores for live-action feature films. When working for Stalling, the orchestra would find itself burdened with more challenging and taxing work. Stalling recorded many variations of the opening themes of the Looney Tunes and Merrie Melodies series. The theme of the Looney Tunes series was "The Merry-Go-Round Broke Down" (1937), a minor hit from the team of Dave Franklin and Cliff Friend. Franklin and Friend were members of the Tin Pan Alley. The theme of the Merrie Melodies series was "Merrily We Roll Along" (1935). An electric guitar provided the song's initial sound effect.

Stalling was a master at quickly changing musical styles based on the action in the cartoon. His arrangements were complicated and technically demanding. The music itself served both as a background for the cartoon, and provided musical sound effects. The titles of the music often described the action, sometimes forming jokes for those familiar with the tunes.

Stalling made extensive use of the many works of Raymond Scott, whose music was licensed by Warner Bros. in the early 1940s. According to Strauss, Stalling relied heavily on the music Scott composed during the 1930s. For example, the reportedly "fast and wacky" "Powerhouse" (1937) by Scott was frequently used to accompany animated scenes involving conveyor-belts or chases. Scott's works had a cartoon sensibility and brought visual images to mind, elements which Stalling needed for his compositions. Due to Stalling's frequent use of his works, Raymond Scott was eventually considered a "cartoon composer" in his own right. But Scott did not actually compose his works with the intention of using them as film scores.

Stalling's cues are always tied to the story on the screen. For example, he often used "The Lady in Red" and "Oh, You Beautiful Doll" in scenes with attractive women or characters in female drag, and "California, Here I Come" for scenes where characters make hasty departures. Scenes involving automobiles were often accompanied by "In My Merry Oldsmobile", and scenes involving airplanes were often accompanied by the theme song to Captains of the Clouds. Raymond Scott's "In an 18th Century Drawing Room" is usually associated with Granny in the Sylvester and Tweety shorts, and his "Powerhouse" pops up in scenes of machines, factories or mechanical devices. Stalling composed music for the Gioachino Rossini-derived short Rabbit of Seville, and linked "The Dance of the Comedians" from Bedřich Smetana's opera The Bartered Bride to Wile E. Coyote and the Road Runner. Stalling is remembered today for the scores of cartoons that remain popular, and are often remembered for their music. His melodies are heard through most of the classic Warner Bros. cartoons, and imitated in new Looney Tunes compilations and features such as Looney Tunes: Back in Action.

Film critic Leonard Maltin pointed out that listening to the soundtracks of the Warner cartoons was an important part of his musical education; the use of the full Warner Bros. Orchestra resulted in a richness of sound that is often lacking in more modern cartoons.

Neuwirth considers Stalling's work style in the Warner Bros. films to be highly recognizable. It consisted of "lush orchestrations", sampling of popular songs, and "hair-trigger shifts in pacing". The pacing of the film score could quickly change from manic and furious to slow and gentle, and back again. Stalling's music would match the mood required for any given scene. Neuwirth argues that the music managed to enhance the mood set by these scenes. This was what made Stalling's work so effective.

== Comments by Chuck Jones ==
Jones and the other Looney Tunes directors sometimes complained about Stalling's proclivity for musical quotation and punning. In an interview, Jones complained:

He was a brilliant musician. But the quickest way for him to write a musical score was to simply look up some music that had the proper name. If there was a lady dressed in red, he'd always play "The Lady in Red". If somebody went into a cave, he'd play Fingal's Cave. If we were doing anything about eating, he'd do "A Cup of Coffee, a Sandwich and You". I had a bee one time, and my God, if he didn't go and find a piece of music written in 1906 or something called "I'm a Busy Little Bumble Bee".

Musicologist and animation historian Daniel Goldmark has noted that Jones repeated this anecdote about Stalling in a number of interviews. Jones also claimed in a 1975 interview that "My Funny Little Bumble Bee" song was too obscure for the audience to notice the musical reference. He exaggerated that one had to be 108-years-old to even remember the existence of the song. Goldmark believes that the anecdote itself was inaccurate in several ways. The "Bumble Bee song" of the anecdote was actually "Be My Little Baby Bumble Bee" (1912), which was not obscure to begin with. It was a hit song from the musical A Winsome Widow, produced by Florenz Ziegfeld Jr. It had also been recorded to great acclaim by the popular duo of Ada Jones and Billy Murray. And Stalling actually used this song only once during his entire tenure at Warner Bros. Cartoons. The song served as the title music of The Bee-Deviled Bruin (1949), an animated short directed by Jones. Goldmark has also noted that Jones' claim about the repeated use of Fingal's Cave in cave scenes was inaccurate. Stalling did use the melody composed by Felix Mendelssohn in several animated shorts, but never in combination with an actual cave scene.

== Recordings ==
- The Carl Stalling Project: Music From Warner Bros. Cartoons, 1936–1958. Warner Bros., 1990
- The Carl Stalling Project Volume 2: More Music From Warner Bros. Cartoons, 1939–1957. Warner Bros., 1995
- Bugs Bunny on Broadway. (Broadway Cast Album conducted by George Daugherty) Warner Bros., 1990
- Bugs Bunny at the Symphony. (Live Concert Recording from the Sydney Opera House with the Sydney Symphony conducted by George Daugherty.) Warner Bros., 2010
