= By the Beautiful Sea =

By the Beautiful Sea may refer to:

- "By the Beautiful Sea" (song), a 1914 popular song
- By the Beautiful Sea (musical), a 1954 musical
