= Elise Stevenson =

British-born American singer (1878–1967)

Elise Stevenson (February 9, 1878 – November 18, 1967) was a British-born American soprano singer who recorded commercially successful popular songs in the early years of the 20th century.

== Biography ==
She was born Eliza Stevens in Liverpool, England, and emigrated to the United States. She became a member of the Lyric Quartet, with Harry Macdonough, Frank Stanley, and Corrine Morgan, and also of the Trinity Choir.

From 1907, she recorded as a solo singer for Victor Records. Frank Stanley was her manager, as well as her partner in many duet recordings; she also recorded with Harry Macdonough, and Henry Burr.

Her most successful recordings included "The Linger Longer Girl" (1907), "Because You're You" (1907), "Are You Sincere?" (1908), "Good Evening, Caroline" (with Frank Stanley, 1909), and "Shine On, Harvest Moon" (with Harry Macdonough, 1909).

She married Milton Rusling Wood in 1905, and thereafter was occasionally billed as Elise (or Elsie) Wood. She retired from recording at the peak of her popularity, soon after 1911, to raise a family.

She died in 1967 in Laguna Beach, California, at the age of 89.

== Discography ==
- Elise Stevenson recordings at the Discography of American Historical Recordings.
