= Sunbird (disambiguation) =

Sunbird may refer to:

- The bird family Nectariniidae
- Holden Sunbird, a mid-sized sedan automobile
- Mozilla Sunbird, a calendar and scheduling program
- Pontiac Sunbird, one of two kinds of car made by General Motors
- Stanton Sunbird, New Zealand homebuilt motor glider
- Sunbird, a person, especially an older person, who moves to a more desirable climate
- Sunbird, a short story by Neil Gaiman
- Sunbird (album)
- The Sunbird, a book by Wilbur Smith
- Three-legged crow, a Chinese mythological bird with association to the sun
- Verilite Sunbird, 1980s United States civil utility aircraft

== See also ==
- "Sun Bird", a 1908 intermezzo
- Golden Sun Bird, an ancient Chinese artifact
