= Oh! You Kid! =

1908/1909 popular songs and catchphrase

Sheet music for 1909 song by Harry Von Tilzer and Jimmy Lucas

"Oh! You Kid!" is the title, or part of the title, of several popular songs published in 1908 and 1909. It became a widely used popular catchphrase. The most successful song using the phrase, "I Love, I Love, I Love My Wife – But Oh! You Kid!", was written by Harry Von Tilzer and lyricist Jimmy Lucas, and recorded by the duo of Ada Jones and Billy Murray.

== Early songs ==
In 1908, the Shapiro music company in New York City published a song, "Oh, You Kid!", written by Melville Gideon and lyricist Edgar Selden. It introduced the word "kid" as a term of endearment, and became a minor hit. The sheet music cover indicates that the song was performed by Dorothy Drew.

The following year, the vaudeville duo of Harry Armstrong and Billy Clark used the song's refrain for their own, less successful, song, "I Love My Wife; But, Oh, You Kid!".

== Von Tilzer and Lucas ==
In turn, the song by Armstrong and Clark inspired fellow songwriters Harry Von Tilzer and Jimmy Lucas to write their own song, "I Love, I Love, I Love My Wife – But Oh! You Kid!", which was published on May 12, 1909.

The perceived sauciness of the song – the punning line "I'm married, but... that 'but' my dear means you." and its explicit but relaxed view of adulterous flirtation – contributed to its popularity. The song was performed in vaudeville and sold as sheet music. It was recorded by several artists including Arthur Collins, as well as the duo of Ada Jones and Billy Murray.

It led to a succession of rewrites and parodies, such as "I Love My Wife—But Oh! Her Family" and "I Love My Horse and Wagon—But Oh You Buick Car!", as well as a craze for songs with themes of adultery played as humor, such as "I Won’t Be Home ‘Till Late, Dear", "She Borrowed My Only Husband (And Forgot to Bring Him Back)", "I’m Just as Good as Single (I’ve Sent My Wife Away)", and "My Wife’s Gone to the Country! Hurrah! Hurrah!" (written by the young Irving Berlin). It was also parodied at a White House dinner, where guests sang "We love, we love, we love Roosevelt—but oh, you Taft!”.

In 1943, Von Tilzer took legal action against Lucas and the Jerry Vogel Music Company. Von Tilzer claimed that he had written the lyrics of "I Love, I Love, I Love My Wife – But Oh! You Kid!", as well as the music, and that he had agreed to credit Lucas because Lucas had suggested the song title and agreed to plug it. Von Tilzer's claim was dismissed.

== Scandal and subsequent use ==
Von Tilzer's song became a succès de scandale in 1909, and brought some public censure. It was vehemently denounced by prominent evangelist Billy Sunday. The phrase "Oh! You Kid!" became ubiquitous.

It also led to legal action. A farmer in Missouri who sent a woman a postcard saying "I Love My Wife, But Oh You Kid!" was given a fine for sending improper matter through the mail. A judge in Los Angeles ruled that anyone using the salutation "Oh, you kid!" in public should be imprisoned on a charge of disturbing the peace, and a magistrate in Pittsburgh said that anyone using the phrase in public should be whipped. In Atlanta, a man was shot by a woman's husband for crying "Oh, you kid!" towards her; the gunman was released without charge.

Jody Rosen of Slate commented that "the reaction of the social reformers and guardians of public morality to the song... show us the same kinds of moral panics that greeted... later forms of popular music."

The craze died down by 1910, though the phrase continued in popular usage, being particularly favored by Groucho Marx. The 1946 musical The Harvey Girls included a new song, "Oh, You Kid", written by Harry Warren and Johnny Mercer and performed by Angela Lansbury.
