= Rodeo Dough =

1931 film

- Screenshot
- Directed by: Ben Harrison; Manny Gould
- Story by: Ben Harrison
- Produced by: Charles Mintz
- Music by: Joe DeNat
- Animation by: Manny Gould
- Color process: Black and white
- Production company: Charles Mintz Studio
- Distributed by: Columbia Pictures
- Release date: February 13, 1931
- Running time: 7:07
- Language: English

Rodeo Dough is a 1931 American short animated Western film by Columbia Pictures, and stars the comic strip character Krazy Kat.

== Plot ==
Krazy Kat and his spaniel sweetheart are cowpokes. They are riding on a horse and kissing each other. On the way, they find a flyer on a post, promoting a rodeo event that offers considerable prize money. The spaniel asks Krazy to registering, but the cat is too timid at first. When the spaniel flirts with him, Krazy is flattered and becomes obliged to try his luck.

Krazy enters the venue and meets up with the other contestants. The other contestants laugh at him because of his short stature but Krazy keeps his cool. After a few moments, the games begin and the first challenge involves taming a bodacious bronco. The first two competitors give their shot respectively, but they both only lasted a dozen seconds. Finally, Krazy receives his turn to the field. Because of his lack of rodeo background, however, Krazy was often running away while the bronco chases him all over the place. Watching in stands and fearing for her boyfriend's life, the spaniel tosses a lasso around the surging steed, stopping it in place. The bronco, not realizing what is going on, thinks it is under a spell implemented by the cat. Capitalizing on the opportunity, Krazy then holds out and vibrates his paws, attempting to use hypnosis even though he does not actually possess such ability. Nevertheless, the naive bronco, still paranoid about the "spell", obeys the cat's command and goes tap dancing. This is a victory for Krazy.

Following the challenge with the bronco, other acts just for entertainment take center stage. First a trio of colts dance in the field. Next, Krazy exhibits moves with a lariat, and some pintos momentarily take part in his performance.

Then comes the final challenge, where Krazy encounters a fierce bull. Once more, the cat tries to apply hypnotism. Recalling what seemingly happened to the bronco, the bull actually believes Krazy can control minds, thus taking the cat's order to do a ballet. In this, Krazy is declared winner of the event, and the spectators are delighted.

After collecting his prize money in two cash bags, Krazy boards his own horse. He then comes to the stands and approaches his sweetheart. The spaniel is amazed by how things turned out, and affectionately asks Krazy to carry her along. Krazy picks up his canine girlfriend and puts her on his lap. The two set off in the horse and run into the horizon.

== Notes ==
- Songs mentioned in the short include I'm a Yiddish Cowboy (1908) and My Pony Boy (1909).
- The short is included in the Columbia Cartoon Collection: Volume 1.

== See also ==
- Krazy Kat filmography
