= I've Got a Pain in My Sawdust =

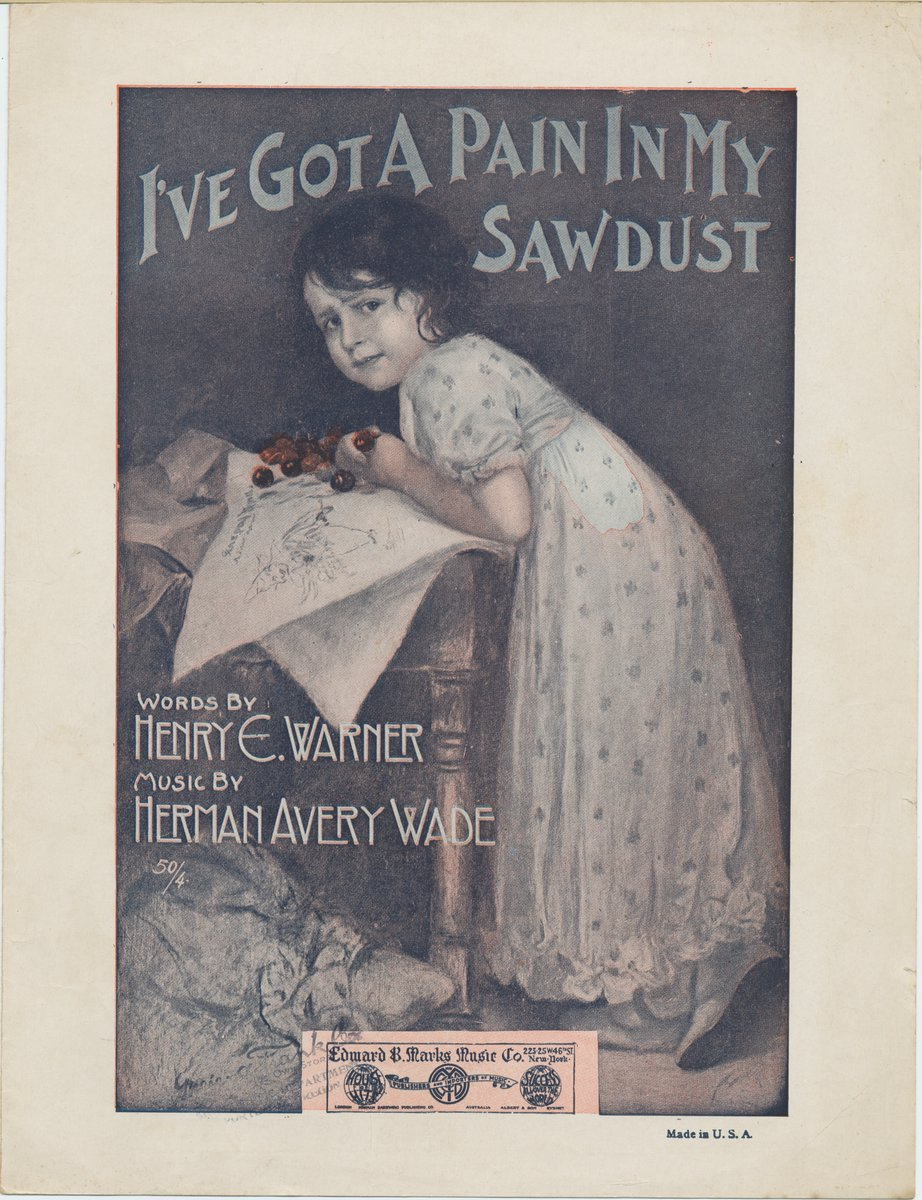
1920 sheet music cover.

"I've Got a Pain in My Sawdust (The Plaint of the Little Bisque Doll)" was a popular song. The music was composed by Herman Avery Wade, and the lyrics were written by Henry Edward Warner. The song was originally copyrighted in 1909 by Joseph W. Stern & Co. with these rights bought for publication in the United States by Edward B. Marks Music Co. of New York in 1920. The sheet music lists the performance medium as piano, voice, and chords.

The song is dedicated to Kitty Cheatham, who first recorded it on February 15, 1910. It was recorded again by Mae Questel on January 16, 1935, as a b-side to "On the Good Ship Lollipop". Tiny Tim recorded the song in 1962 under the title "I Got a Pain in My Sawdust".

In 2007, the song, primarily the third verse, was used in a seventh season episode of the U.S. television series CSI: Crime Scene Investigation ("Living Doll").

== Lyrics ==
(A 'motive of pain' is exclaimed before the singing of the chorus, which is sung from point of view of the character of the little bisque doll.)

Verse 1:

A little bisque doll and a little rag doll /
And a dolly imported from France /
Were sitting one day on the shelf of the store /
With a doll that could wind up and dance /
When all of a sudden, the shopkeeper heard /
A scream that rang out thro' the store /
And this was the plaint of the little bisque doll /
That made such an awful uproar

Chorus:

I've got a pain in my sawdust /
That's what's the matter with me /
Something is wrong with my little inside/
I'm just as sick as can be /
Don't let me faint, someone get me a fan /
Someone else run for the medicine man /
Ev'ryone hurry as fast as you can /
I've got a pain in my sawdust

Verse 2:

They took her away in a hospital van /
And the whole town was filled with the blues /
For ev'ryone thought it was quite an odd thing /
And the papers all printed the news /
The surgeons looked wise and they all shook their heads /
And asked her just where she was sick /
"I think it's 'appendi-sawdust'!", she exclaimed /
"And won't you please do something quick?"

Chorus Repeat

Verse 3:

Oh, sad was the day for the little bisque doll /
For they cut all her stitches away /
and found the seat of the terrible ache /
"'Twas a delicate task," they all say /
For none of the surgeons had ever before /
Performed on a dolly's inside /
They tried to re-stuff her but didn't know how /
And this was her wail as she died

Chorus Repeat (spoken, expressively)

"Funeral March" bridge

Sung:

She had a pain in her sawdust.
