= My Prairie Song Bird =

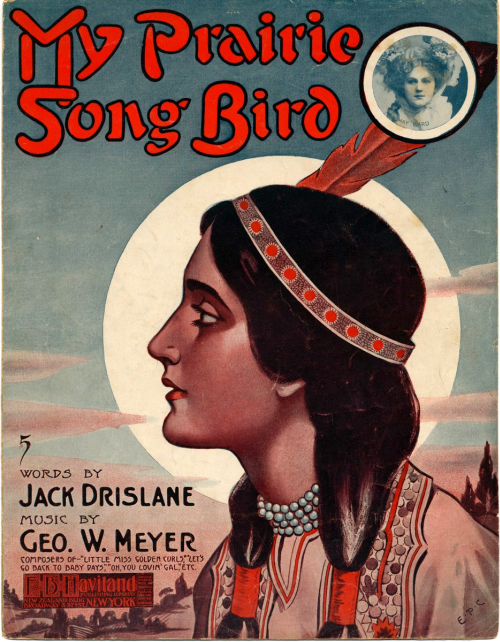
- Sheet music cover, 1909

Song
- Published: 1909
- Composer(s): George W. Meyer
- Lyricist(s): Jack Drislane

"My Prairie Song Bird" is 1909 popular song composed by George W. Meyer and with lyrics written by Jack Drislane. In the song, the singer is asking Prairie Song Bird to marry him. The chorus is:

My Prairie Song Bird Fairy,
My little love canary,
Your voice is so entrancing,
It set my heart a dancing,
Your love-notes seem to thrill me,
With joy and gladness fill me,
Sing on, my little Prairie Song Bird.

== Early recordings ==
- Burr & Stanley, Victor 16560 (1910).

== Bibliography ==
- Drislane, Jack (w.); Meyer, George W. (m.). "My Prairie Song Bird" (Sheet music). New York: F.B. Haviland Publishing Co. (1909).
- Kinkle, Roger D. The Complete Encyclopedia of Popular Music and Jazz, 1900-1950. New York: Arlington House (1974).
