= Jack Norworth =

American musician (1879–1959)

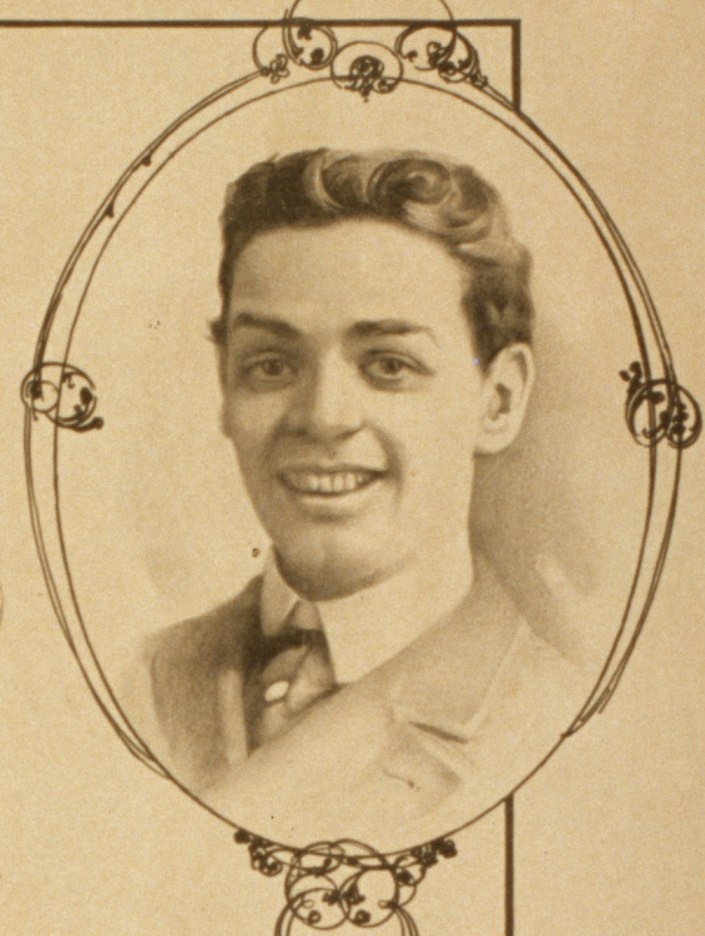
- Norworth in 1900

Background information
- Born: John Godfrey Knauff; January 5, 1879; Philadelphia, Pennsylvania, U.S.
- Died: September 1, 1959 (aged 80) Laguna Beach, California, U.S.
- Genres: Tin Pan Alley
- Occupations: Songwriter; singer; vaudeville performer; actor
- Spouse(s): Nora Bayes, Louise Dresser

John Godfrey Knauff (January 5, 1879 – September 1, 1959), known professionally as Jack Norworth, was an American songwriter, singer and vaudeville performer.

== Biography ==
Norworth is credited as writer of a number of Tin Pan Alley hits. He wrote the lyrics to "Take Me Out to the Ball Game" in 1908, his longest-lasting hit. It wasn't until 1940 that he witnessed a major league baseball game. The song placed at number 8 on the "Songs of the Century" list selected by the National Endowment for the Arts and the Recording Industry Association of America.

His "Shine On, Harvest Moon" was a bigger hit at the time. There is some disagreement about his involvement in its creation. Broadway historian John Kenrick credits Edward Madden and Gus Edwards, while the family of Follies songwriter Dave Stamper claims he wrote the song while working as the pianist for Nora Bayes, the officially credited co-writer with Norworth. Another possibility for the music could lie with George Gershwin, who was also a piano player for this vaudeville troupe. Albert Koch, of Wisconsin, also an accomplished songwriter, claims to have written the song himself, and sold it outright for $50, forfeiting the rights to the song.

Other popular songs credited to Norworth include "Back to My Old Home Town"; "Come Along, My Mandy"; "Dear Dolly"; "Good Evening, Caroline"; "Holding Hands"; "Honey Boy"; "I'm Glad I'm a Boy/I'm Glad I'm a Girl"; "I'm Glad I'm Married"; "Kitty"; "Meet Me in Apple Blossom Time"; "Over on the Jersey Side"; "Since My Mother Was a Girl"; "Sing an Irish Song" and "Smarty." "Turn Off Your Light, Mr. Moon Man" is a sequel to "Shine on, Harvest Moon."

Born John Godfrey Knauff in Philadelphia, Pennsylvania to Theodore Christian Knauff and Louise H. (Pearson) Knauff, he changed his name to Jack Norworth when he went into show business. His father was an organ builder and also a choir director at St. Mark's Episcopal Church in Philadelphia. The theater was not a reputable career in that time especially coming from a religious family. Following a few years at sea, he landed in New York City at age 20 to embark on a show business career. In 1908, he married Nora Bayes, with whom he performed in vaudeville; the couple divorced in 1913. Following the Ziegfeld Follies (1909), Norworth appeared in a number of Broadway theater productions and was heard on early radio, such as his March 1928 guest appearance on Acousticon Hour. He also appeared April, 13, 1958 on the Ed Sullivan Show to sing "Take Me Out to the Ball Game" along with four players (Ford, Berra, Mantle, Skowron) from the New York Yankees.

Before Bayes, he had been married to actress Louise Dresser. He appeared in early sound films with his third wife, Dorothy Adelphi. His last film role came as a doctor in The Southerner (1945) under the direction of Jean Renoir. He was portrayed by Dennis Morgan in the 1944 musical film Shine On, Harvest Moon (in which Ann Sheridan played Bayes as the love of Norworth's life) and by Ron Husmann in the 1978 Ziegfeld biopic Ziegfeld: The Man & His Women. He is a member of the Songwriters Hall of Fame.

Jack Norworth died of a heart attack in Laguna Beach, California in 1959 and was interred at Melrose Abbey Memorial Park in Anaheim, California, just across I-5 from the Los Angeles Angels ballpark.

On July 11, 2010, a 3-foot-tall (0.91 m) black granite monument, paid for by concerned fans, was installed about 100 feet from Jack's actual headstone.

Take Me Out to the Ball Game
"Take Me Out to the Ball Game", by Jack Norworth and Albert Von Tilzer, sung by Edward Meeker for Edison Records in September 1908.

Shine On, Harvest Moon
1909 Edison Records recording of Jack Norworth and Nora Bayes' 1908 hit Shine On, Harvest Moon with Ada Jones and Billy Murray

== Listen to ==
- Jack Norworth (five songs)
