= All She Gets from the Iceman Is Ice =

"All She Gets from the Iceman Is Ice" is a popular song, originally published in 1907 and written by Arthur J. Lamb and Alfred Solman. As with many popular songs of the era, it is largely forgotten today, although a 1908 version by Ada Jones can be found at several websites because it is now public domain. Additionally, the UCSB Cylinder Audio Archive has a version by Edward M. Favor issued on Indestructible Records.

== See also ==
- 1907 in music
- 1908 in music
