= Golden Arrow (song) =

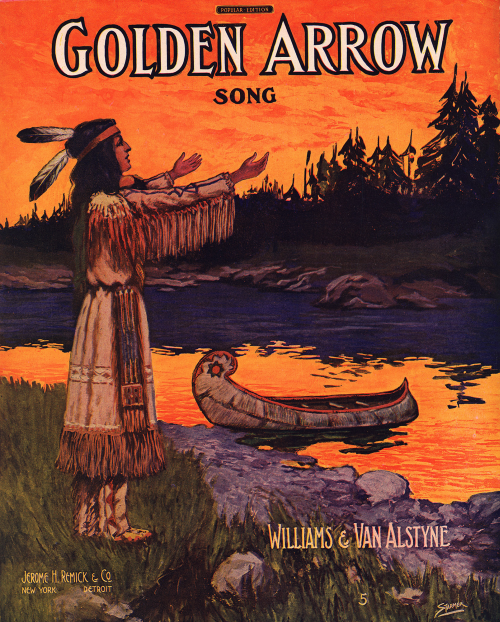
- Sheet music cover, 1909

Song
- Published: 1909
- Composer: Egbert Van Alstyne
- Lyricist: Harry Williams

"Golden Arrow" is a popular song published both as an intermezzo two-step and a ballad in 1909. The music was composed by Egbert Van Alstyne, with lyrics added by Harry Williams. The ballad is a love story between the unnamed son of a Chief Arrow-Bow and a maiden named Golden Arrow, both of the Sioux nation in Idaho.

== Lyrics ==
The lyrics as written by Williams:

Out in the shade of a glade sat a maid
With burning cheeks all aglow
Eyes black as night, but as bright as the light of any sunset in Idaho
For by her side was the pride of a tribe, the son of Chief Arrow-Bow
And in the ear of his dear, sweet and clear, he whispered low

Chorus:
My little Golden Arrow I love you
You've pierced my heart it's true, pretty Sioux, through and through
Take me to be your fallen sparrow, do—
For Golden Arrow my life belongs to you
(repeat)

She then replied "I'm your bride by your side
We'll hunt the big buffalo
I'll be your dear, never fear, ever near
For I'm your Arrow and you're my 'beau'
You lead the way where you may from today, for you must guide me, you know
Then I can see we'll agree, come with me," said Arrow-Bow
(Chorus)

== Bibliography ==
- Williams, Harry (w.); Van Alstyne, Egbert (m.). "Golden Arrow" (Sheet music). New York: Jerome H. Remick (1909).
