= Bessie Wynn =

American actress and singer

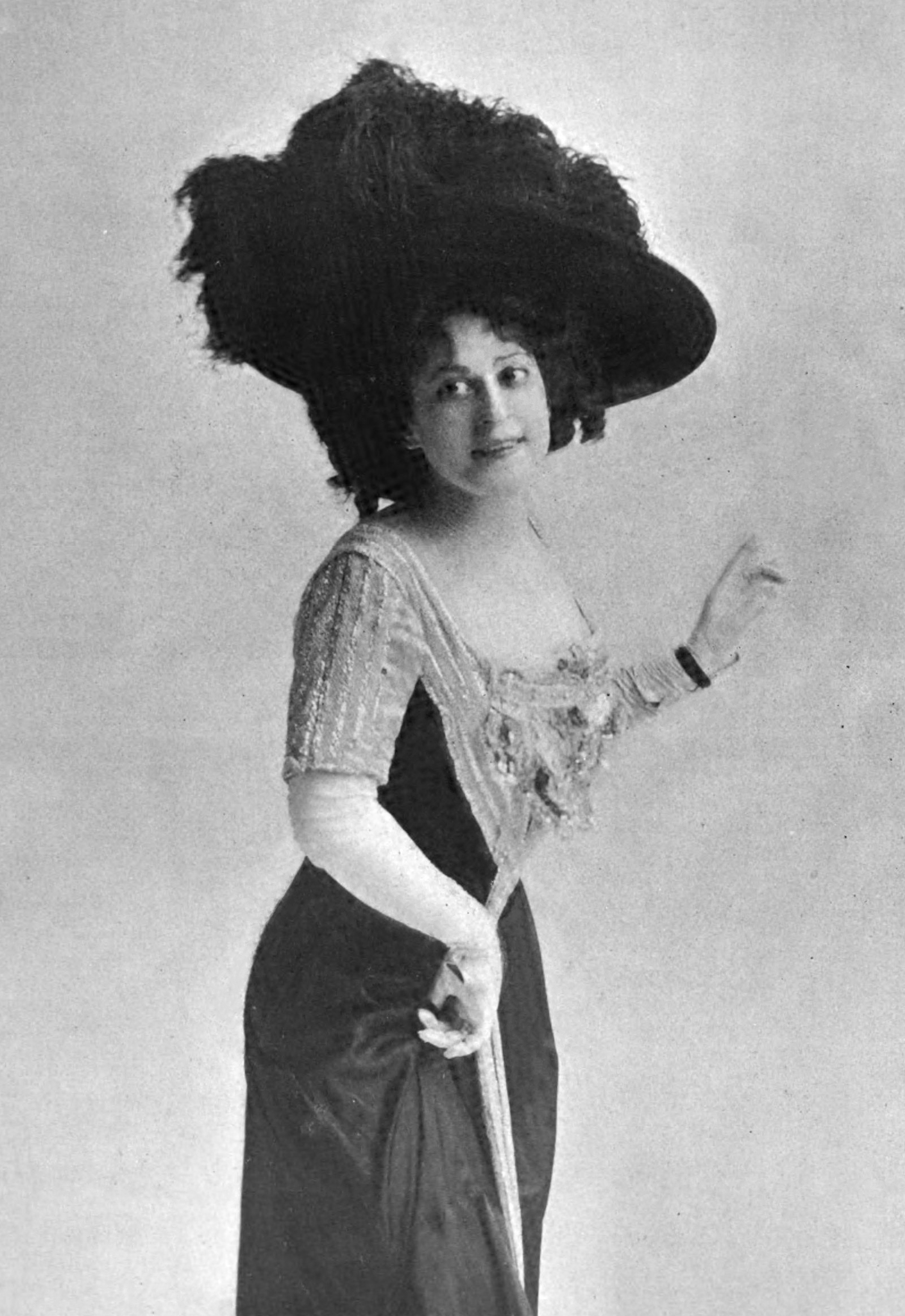
- Born: June 1876; Adrian, Michigan, US
- Died: July 8, 1968 (aged 92); Towaco, New Jersey, US
- Occupation: Actress
- Years active: 1899-1930s

Bessie Wynn (June 1876 – July 8, 1968) was an American stage and vaudeville actress and singer. She was born in Adrian, Michigan and sang in the Baptist Church choir while growing up. At 23 in 1899 she first appeared in the chorus of Papa's Wife starring Anna Held. She continued on Broadway and ultimately appeared in two enormous hit plays The Wizard of Oz(1902) starring Anna Laughlin;, Babes in Toyland(1903–05) with William Norris and Mabel Barrison; and Wonderland in 1905. In 1907 she began appearing in Vaudeville and was a highly paid starrer for the Keith-Orpheum organization. She continued with Keith's in Vaudeville until Keith's folded in the 1930s. She then retired to her own chicken farm but came out of retirement in 1949 for a Palace Theater revival of Vaudeville programs.

As far as motion pictures she appeared in two news animated weeklys in 1913 and 1914. If she appeared for earlier film companies such as Edison, Lubin or Biograph she did so anonymously.
