= Foerster & Sons =

Carl Foerster & Sons was a Milwaukee maker of bandoneóns, concertinas, accordions, reed organs, and roller organs. Founded by German migrants, it was active from at least 1909 through at least the 1920s.
