= Be My Little Baby Bumble Bee =

- Sheet music, 1912

Song
- Published: 1912
- Composer(s): Henry I. Marshall
- Lyricist(s): Stanley Murphy

Audio sample
- Recording of Be My Little Baby Bumble Bee, performed by Billy Murray and Ada Jones (1912): file; help

"Be My Little Baby Bumble Bee" is a popular song. The music was written by Henry I. Marshall and the lyrics by Stanley Murphy. The song was published in 1912, and appeared in the 1912 play A Winsome Widow.

The song has since become a standard, recorded by many artists. One of the most popular early recordings was by Ada Jones and Billy Murray who recorded it as a duet on July 8, 1912 for Victor Records (catalog 17152 B).

Doris Day and Russell Arms performed the song in the 1953 film By the Light of the Silvery Moon.

== Noteworthy recordings ==
- Ada Jones and Billy Murray (1912)
- Ada Jones and Walter Van Brunt (1912)
- Gordon MacRae and June Hutton – on the album Songs from 'By the Light of the Silvery Moon'... (1953).
- Doris Day on the album By the Light of the Silvery Moon (1953)
