= My Pony Boy =

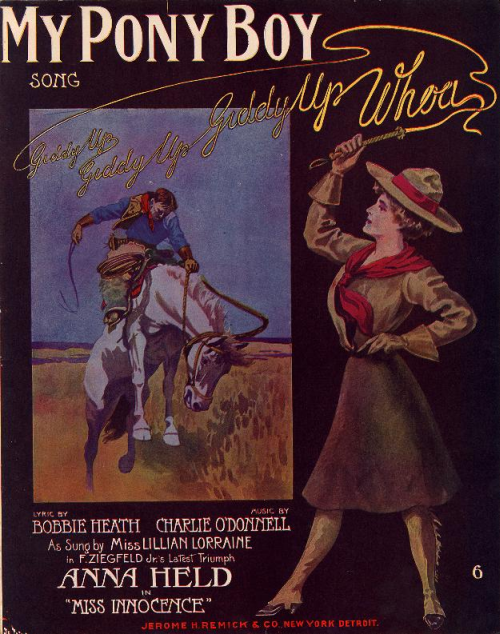
- Sheet music cover (1909)

Song
- Language: English
- Published: 1909
- Songwriter(s): Composer: Charley O'Donnell; Lyricist: Bobbie Heath

"My Pony Boy" is a popular song written in 1909 by Bobby Heath (lyrics) and Charley O'Donnell. It was incorporated into the Broadway musical Miss Innocence (1909) where it was introduced by Lillian Lorraine.

== Description ==
Along with songs like "Cheyenne", it became a cliché, as its tune was frequently used in Western movies and cartoons. It works especially well when played on a "honky tonk" piano.

The first verse explains that the central character of the song has many female admirers; the second that the "Fluffy Ruffle girl" has won his heart. The chorus:

Pony Boy, Pony Boy
Won't you be my Tony boy

Don't say no
Here we go
Off across the plains

Marry me
Carry me
Right away with you

Giddy up, giddy up, giddy up, whoa!
My Pony Boy

The old expression "giddy up", exhorting a horse to gallop at high speed, is a corruption of "get ye up". "Tony" is a hypocorism (affectionate shortened version) of "Anthony", although the adjective "tony" refers to someone of high "tone" or social elegance.

In the 1931 Krazy Kat short Rodeo Dough, a female spaniel sings the song after Krazy wins a rodeo event. In the 1950s, the song was used in a commercial selling a juice concentrate also called Pony Boy.

== Recordings ==
Singer Ada Jones recorded it for Victor Records # 16356 in August 1909.

Vocal group Peerless Quartet recorded for Columbia Records (catalog No. 713) in May 1909.

Singer Bing Crosby included the song in a medley on his album On the Happy Side (1962).

Singer-songwriter Bruce Springsteen included a modified version as the last song on his 1992 album Human Touch.

== Bibliography ==
- Heath, Bobbie; O'Donnell, Charlie. "My Pony Boy" (sheet music). New York: Jerome H. Remick & Co. (1909).
