= By the Beautiful Sea (song) =

1914 popular music song

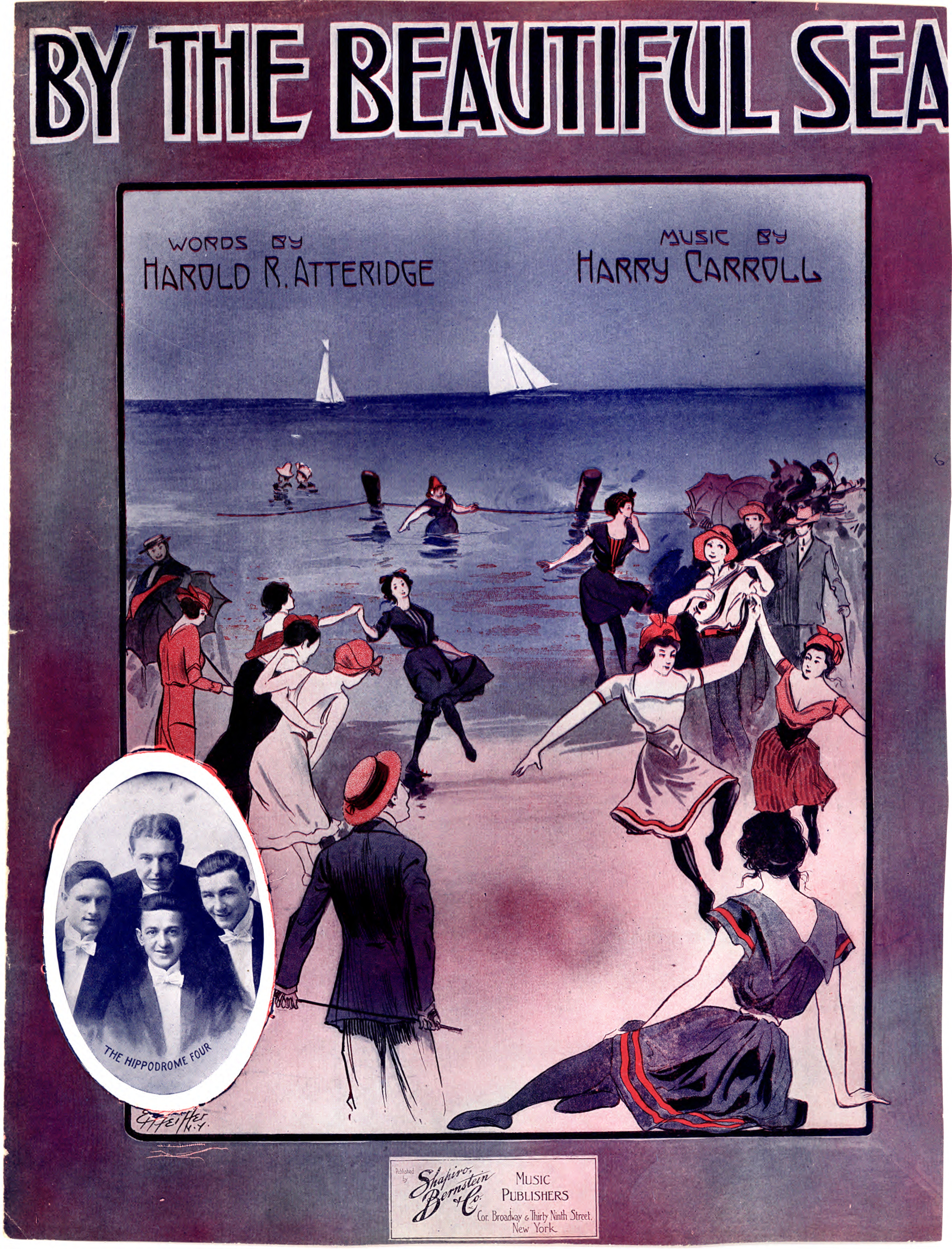
- Sheet music cover, 1914

Song
- Published: 1914
- Composer: Harry Carroll
- Lyricist: Harold R. Atteridge

Audio sample
- Recording of By the Beautiful Sea, performed by the Heidelberg Quintet (1914): file; help

"By the Beautiful Sea" is a popular song published in 1914, with music written by Harry Carroll and lyrics written by Harold R. Atteridge. The melody was composed on the terrace of Reisenweber's Brighton Beach Casino. The sheet music was published by Shapiro, Bernstein & Co.

The song was originally recorded by the Heidelberg Quintet, topping the early American music charts for six weeks in the summer of 1914, during the outbreak of World War I. Other popular recordings in 1914 were by Ada Jones & Billy Watkins, and by Prince's Orchestra.

The song was featured in a 1931 Screen Songs sing-along animated cartoon by Fleischer Studios.

A portion of the song is sung in the Season 4 episode of I Love Lucy during a Vaudeville-esque routine performed by Fred Mertz on Ricky Ricardo's show.

== See also ==
- List of best-selling sheet music
