= Sun Bird =

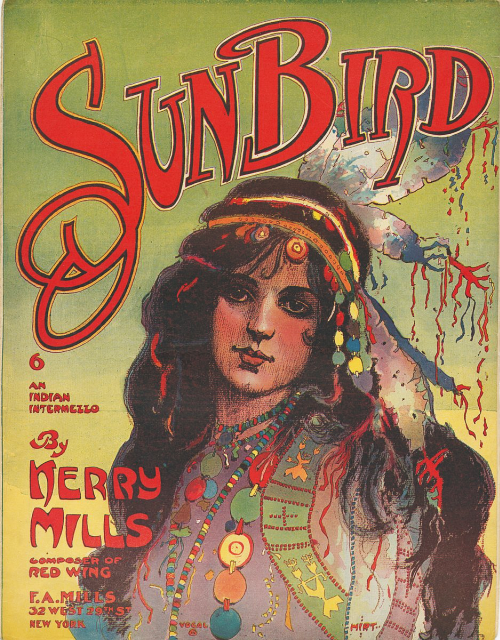
- Sheet music cover, 1908

Composition
- Published: 1908
- Composer(s): Kerry Mills
- Lyricist(s): Thurland Chattaway

"Sun Bird" is an intermezzo composed by Kerry Mills in 1908. Thurland Chattaway wrote lyrics that appear in some later publications. The chorus is a love song from an Indian warrior to Sun Bird, an Indian maiden:

Oh, pretty Sun Bird,— just whisper one word
To guide me on my way day by day 'neath the prairie sky
And when I'm dreaming— 'mid camp fires gleaming
My love star shines for you, all for you, my sun Bird
(repeat)

The song has been recorded numerous times in many different styles.

== Bibliography ==
- Chattaway, Thurland (w.); Mills, Kerry (m.). "Sun Bird" (Sheet music). Sydney: Albert & Son (c. 1908).
- Mills, Kerry. "Sun Bird" (Sheet music). New York: F.A. Mills (1908).
