= I've Got Rings On My Fingers =

1909 song by Weston, Barnes, and Scott

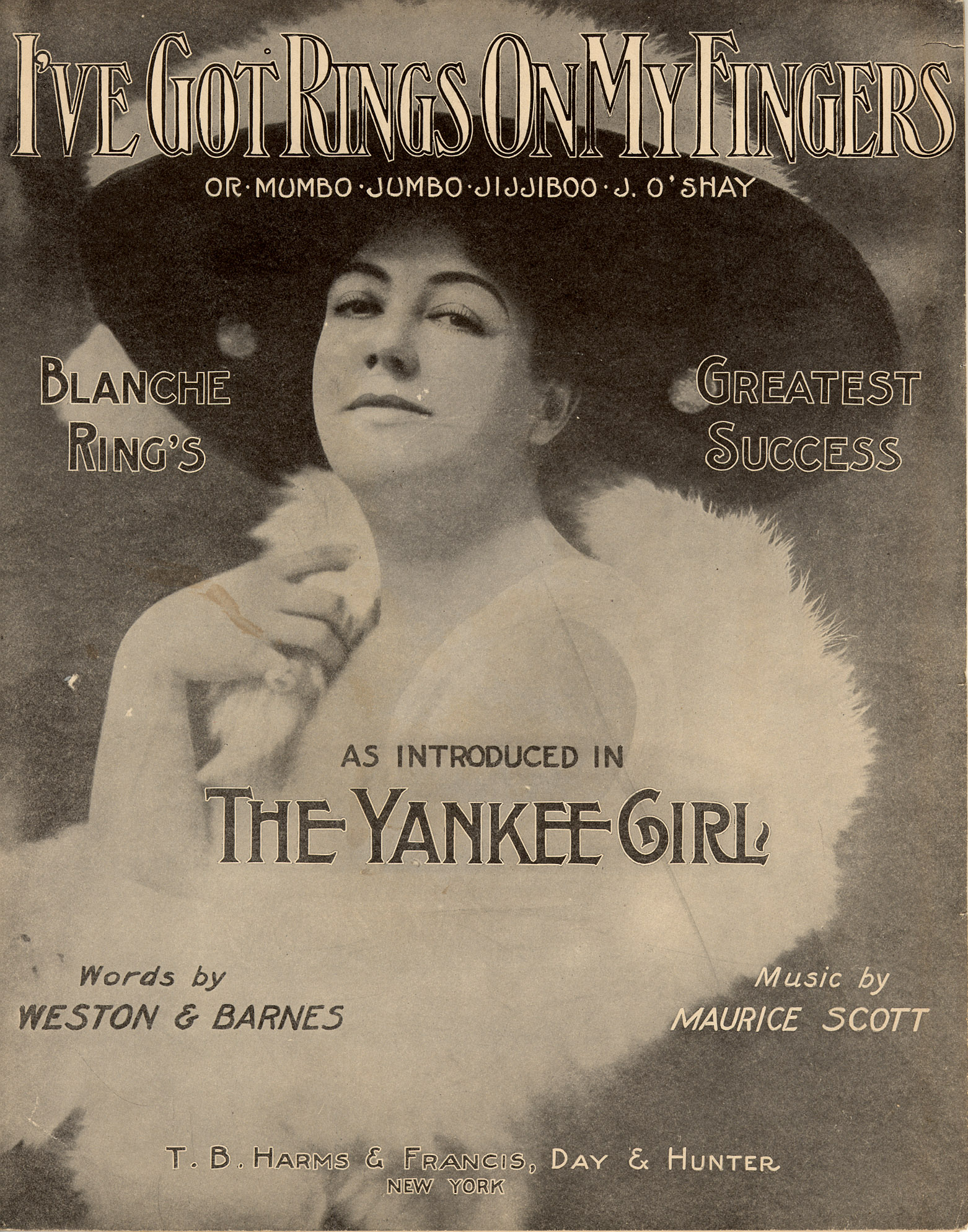
1909 sheet music cover

"I've Got Rings On My Fingers" is a popular song written in 1909, words by R. P. Weston and Fred J. Barnes, and music by Maurice Scott. It concerns an Irishman named Jim O'Shea, a castaway who finds himself on an island somewhere in the East Indies, whereupon he is made Chief Panjandrum by the natives because they like his red hair and his Irish smile. He then sends a letter to his girlfriend, Rose McGee, imploring her to come join him.

The song was a hit for Ada Jones, and for Blanche Ring (who first performed it in The Midnight Sons, and carried it over into 1910's The Yankee Girl). The verses explain the situation. The chorus is best remembered:

Sure, I've got rings on my fingers,
Bells on my toes,
Elephants to ride upon,
My little Irish Rose
So, come to your Nabob
And next Patrick's Day
Be Mistress Mumbo Jumbo Jijjiboo J. O'Shea

The first two lines of the chorus refer to the nursery rhyme:

Ride a cock horse to Banbury Cross
To see a fine lady upon a white horse
Rings on her fingers and bells on her toes
She shall have music wherever she goes.

A version of that rhyme was published in 1784, according to the Oxford Dictionary of Nursery Rhymes (edited by Peter and Iona Opie, 1951, 1973).

In 1956 the song was recorded by Radio City Music Hall organist Ray Bohr on his first RCA Victor album The Big Sound.

Joan Morris and William Bolcom recorded the song as part of their 1974 debut album, After the Ball.

In 1962, Ray Stevens referenced the expression in his comic song, "Ahab the Arab", in which Ahab's girlfriend Fatima wore "rings on her fingers and bells on her toes and a bone in her nose, ho ho."

In 1928, a children's book, Jiji Lou: The Story of a Cast-Off Doll, by Lurline Bowles Mayol, featured a rag doll named Jiji Lou Jay O'Shay, who explains that her owner found her name "On our phonograph ... It was a song that Sally Lee loved. It was all about 'rings on her fingers and bells on her toes' and it ended with 'Jiji Lou Jay O'Shay.'" The book was illustrated by Fern Bisel Peat and published by Saalfield.
