= Good Evening, Caroline =

Single by Billy Murray
- Released: 1908
- Genre: Pop
- Length: 2:12
- Label: Edison Records
- Songwriters: Albert Von Tilzer and Jack Norworth

"Good Evening, Caroline"

Single by Billy Murray
- Released: 1909
- Genre: Pop
- Length: 2:14
- Label: Indestructible Record Company
- Songwriters: Albert Von Tilzer and Jack Norworth

"Good Evening, Caroline" is a 1908 popular song, written by Albert Von Tilzer and Jack Norworth. The singer Billy Murray made at least two recordings of the song - one from 1908 on Edison Records, and one in 1909 on Indestructible Record Company. The 1909 recording became one of the most popular recordings of its year. Murray's versions are the most commonly heard today.

An Edison Standard Phonograph (model B) playing a Good Evening, Caroline gold moulded record

Another version of the song was recorded in 1908 by Frank C. Stanley and Elise Stevenson (Victor 5627 and Columbia A5080).
