= Shine On, Harvest Moon =

- Sheet music, 1908

Song
- Language: English
- Published: 1908
- Composer: Nora Bayes
- Lyricist: Jack Norworth

Audio sample
- 1909 Edison Records recording with Ada Jones and Billy Murray: file; help

"Shine On, Harvest Moon" is a popular early-1900s song credited to the married vaudeville team Nora Bayes and Jack Norworth. It was one of a series of moon-related Tin Pan Alley songs of the era. The song was debuted by Bayes and Norworth in the Ziegfeld Follies of 1908 to great acclaim. It became a pop standard, and continues to be performed and recorded in the 21st century.

During the vaudeville era, songs were often sold outright, and the purchaser would be credited as the songwriter. John Kenrick's Who's Who in Musicals credits the song's actual writers as Edward Madden and Gus Edwards. However, David Ewen's All the Years of American Popular Music credits Dave Stamper, who contributed songs to 21 editions of the Ziegfeld Follies and was Bayes' pianist from 1903 to 1908. Vaudeville comic Eddie Cantor also credited Stamper in his 1934 book Ziegfeld: The Great Glorifier.

The earliest commercially successful recordings were made in 1909 by Harry Macdonough and Elise Stevenson (Victor 16259), Ada Jones and Billy Murray (Edison 10134), Frank Stanley and Henry Burr (Indestructible 1075), and Bob Roberts (Columbia 668).

== Lyrics ==
=== First verse ===
The night was mighty dark so you could hardly see,
For the moon refused to shine.
Couple sitting underneath a willow tree,
For love they did pine.
Little maid was kinda 'fraid of darkness
So she said, "I guess I'll go."
Boy began to sigh, looked up at the sky,
And told the moon his little tale of woe

=== Chorus ===
Oh, Shine on, shine on, harvest moon
Up in the sky;
I ain't had no lovin'
Since April, January, June or July.
Snow time ain't no time to stay
Outdoors and spoon;
So shine on, shine on, harvest moon,
For me and my gal.

Note: The months in the chorus have been sung in different orders.

The Ada Jones and Billy Murray recording linked on this article has it as April, January, Ju-u-une or July.

Flanagan and Allen, Moon Mullican, Mitch Miller and Leon Redbone used January, February, June or July.

Oliver Hardy, in his rendition from The Flying Deuces, used January, April, June or July.

=== Second verse ===
I can't see why a boy should sigh when by his side
Is the girl he loves so true,
All he has to say is: "Won't you be my bride,
For I love you?
I can't see why I'm telling you this secret,
When I know that you can guess."
Harvest moon will smile,
Shine on all the while,
If the little girl should answer "yes."

(repeat chorus)

== Film and television connections ==
The song has had a long history with Hollywood movies. In 1932, Dave Fleischer directed an animated short titled Shine On Harvest Moon. A 1938 Roy Rogers western was named after the song, as was a 1944 biographical film about Bayes and Norworth.

The song has been featured in dozens of movies, including Along Came Ruth (1933) and The Great Ziegfeld (1936). Laurel and Hardy performed a song-and-dance routine (Hardy singing and both dancing) to the song in their 1939 RKO film The Flying Deuces. The song was also featured in A Tree Grows in Brooklyn (1945), The Eddy Duchin Story (1956), and Pennies from Heaven (1978). There was also a popular British 1980s comedy drama called Shine on Harvey Moon. The song was featured in the 2013 video game BioShock Infinite. It was referenced by Don Rickles in the 1971 Friars Club roast of Jerry Lewis when he said, "Just hope and pray, Shine on Harvest Moon they know." In the 1952 I Love Lucy episode "The Benefit", the song is referenced and the chorus is sung. And Gidney and Cloyd the moon creatures performed the first line of the refrain on an episode of Rocky and His Friends in 1959–60, but sang "Shine on Harvest Earth". The song was also sung by C. W. Stoneking in the pilot episode for Cartoon Network's miniseries Over the Garden Wall. The Backyardigans episode "The Key to the Nile" featured a song called "Please and Thank You" to the tune of this song.

== Other recordings ==
- 1931: by Ethel Waters.
- 1931: Art Gillham's piano recording of the song for Columbia (No. 2374D) on January 5, 1931 was praised by Walter Winchell
- 1931: Ruth Etting revived the song in the Ziegfeld Follies
- 1931: The Boswell Sisters recorded their own arrangement of the revived hit on August 27, 1931 for Brunswick Records (No. 6173).
- 1933: Kate Smith
- 1939: Laurel and Hardy perform it in their film The Flying Deuces
- 1949: Vaughn Monroe on Victor 1705
- 1950: The Chordettes on Columbia LP 6111 Harmony Time
- 1951: Jerry Gray and his orchestra (recorded August 24, Decca Records catalog number 27868)
- 1954: John Serry Sr. and his accordion ensemble for RCA Thesaurus
- 1955: Four Aces "B" side to their #1 hit "Love Is a Many Splendored Thing"
- 1955: Judy Garland on Miss Show Business (Capitol Records) as part of a medley
- 1955: Moon Mullican performed the song live
- 1957: Bonnie Guitar on Dot LP 25069 Moonlight and Shadows
- 1957: Coleman Hawkins and Ben Webster both perform sax in a nearly five-minute jazz version on the album Coleman Hawkins Encounters Ben Webster
- 1958: Mitch Miller recorded it in a medley with "For Me and My Gal" on the album More Sing Along with Mitch
- 1958: William Frawley, who portrayed Fred Mertz on I Love Lucy, recorded the song as part of his LP homage to Vaudeville, Bill Frawley Sings the Old Ones
- 1958: Billy Vaughn on Dot LP 25156 Billy Vaughn Plays
- 1959: The Ink Spots
- 1960: Jaye P. Morgan on MGM 12924
- 1960: Teresa Brewer on Coral LP 57329 Naughty Naughty Naughty
- 1960: Rosemary Clooney included in her album Rosie Solves the Swingin' Riddle!.
- 1960: Bing Crosby and Rosemary Clooney. They recorded the song in 1960 for use on their radio show and it was subsequently included in the CD Bing & Rosie - The Crosby-Clooney Radio Sessions (2010).
- 1961: Bing Crosby included the song in a medley on his album 101 Gang Songs (1961)
- 1961: Isley Brothers with Ray Ellis & Orchestra
- 1962: Platters for their album Sing of Your Moonlight Memories.
- 1963: Nino Tempo and April Stevens on Atco LP 156 Deep Purple
- 1964: Allan Sherman parodied the song as "Shine On, Harvey Bloom" on his album For Swingin' Livers Only!
- 1965: Mance Lipscomb recorded the song live for Arhoolie Records on Texas Songster in a Live Performance
- 1976: Leon Redbone recorded the song for his album Double Time
- 1989: Eight-year-old Britney Spears sang a rendition of the song in her video audition for the Mickey Mouse Club.
- 1992: Kirsten Cooke and Arthur Bostrom perform it as the characters Michelle Dubois and Officer Crabtree in the sitcom 'Allo 'Allo! (Season 8 Episode 7). Carmen Silvera as Madame Edith also sings the number during the closing credits of the same episode.
- 2005: Bobby Bare recorded the song as part of his album The Moon was Blue
- 2007: Marah recorded the song for their EP, Can't Take It with You
- 2012: Lon Milo DuQuette recorded it along with 11 originals on Baba Lon II
- 2017: Mree recorded her own rendition of the song as "Harvest Moon"
- Liza Minnelli also performed the song many times as part of her repertoire, and it appears on several of her recordings.
- Al Jolson had sung the song a few times on some radio shows, though the most notable version is when he was on an NBC Kraft Music Hall Radio Broadcast with actor, comedian, and pianist Oscar Levant.
- Norman Brooks also recorded the song a few times on his various "Sings Al Jolson" albums.
