= The Yama Yama Man =

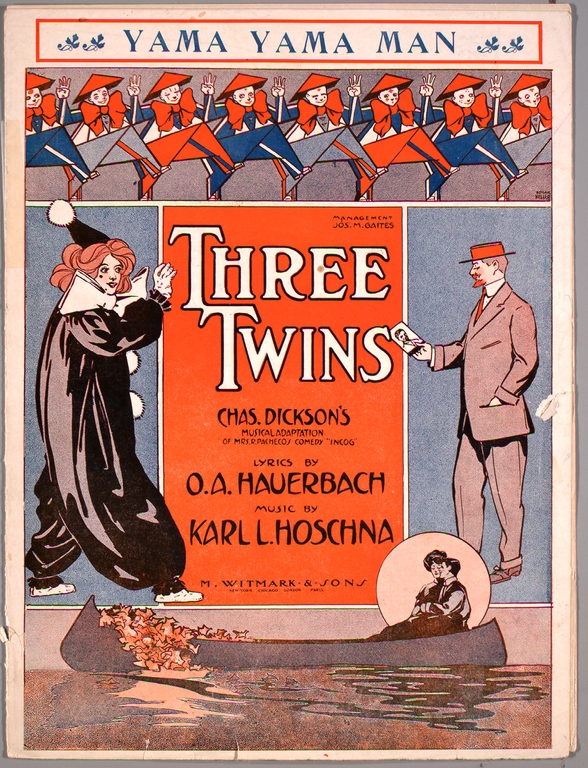
- Sheet music cover, 1908

Song
- Published: 1908
- Genre: Show tune
- Composer: Karl Hoschna
- Lyricist: Collin Davis

"The Yama Yama Man" was a comical song for the Broadway show The Three Twins, published in 1908 by M. Witmark & Sons with music by Karl Hoschna and lyrics by Collin Davis. It became popular after Bessie McCoy's animated performance in a satin Pierrot clown costume with floppy gloves and a cone hat. At age 20, she became an overnight sensation on Broadway and was known thereafter as the "Yama Yama Girl"; it became her lifelong theme song. The show ran for 288 performances. The lyrics contain topical references of the era such as street cars and ladies' fashion while the refrain is about a comical bogeyman—the Yama Yama Man—who is "ready to spring out at you unaware". Bessie McCoy's song and dance routine was a standard into the 1930s with a prestigious lineage of imitators including Ada Jones, Marilyn Miller, Irene Castle and Ginger Rogers.

== History ==
Bessie McCoy's signature performance was key in establishing the song's popularity. According to Marjorie Farnsworth, "thousands came to see Bessie sing and dance as the Yama Yama Girl and then came to see her again.... her knack of dancing the songs became so effective that she often did them in pantomime with the audience filling in the words." According to Joe Laurie Jr she was one of the most imitated routines in vaudeville. Nell Brinkley, who saw McCoy perform, described her thus:

she swings on her heel and leaps away into a wild fantastic headlong dance—the dance of a crazy king's clown, half girl, half wild boy, heady with the wine of the Spring air at twilight … The black satin of her bloomers fills like sails, and they ripple and flatten against her body. Her hair flies in loose flax around her face, and her face is a vivid white candle flame in the yellow aureole of her hair … Her feet might be bounding white balls carrying her body with them in their tireless, leaping flight. She circles madly around the boards, touching lightly and rebounding from the jutting points of the painted mock scenery, like an imprisoned moth, or an elf hunting for some lost thing and fearful of being caught. She is wonderful.

External videos
- Ginger Rogers performing Yama Yama Man from the film The Story of Vernon and Irene Castle (1939).

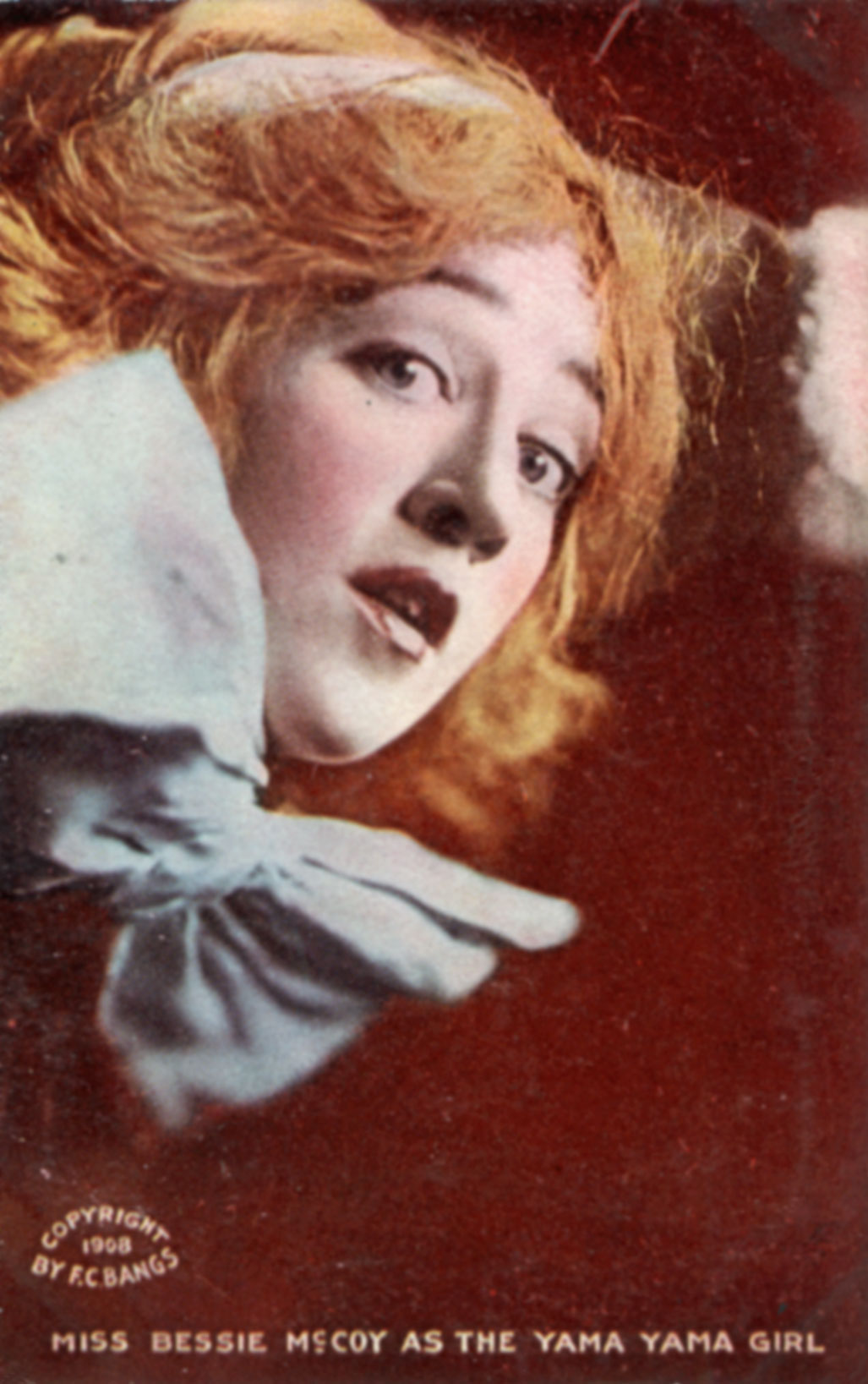
Bessie McCoy in her Yama Yama Man costume with "Terrible eyes and a face of tan.. Ready to spring out at you unaware".

The July 25, 1908, edition of Billboard magazine reported the following story how the Yama song originated. When The Three Twins was rehearsing in Chicago, prior to first opening, Karl Hoschna, the composer, was asked to furnish a "pajama man song". He wrote one called The Pajama Man only to learn that it could not be used owing to another pajama number booked at the Whitney Opera House the next day. Gus Sohlke, the stage director, happened to pass a toy store and saw in the window a doll built out of triangles. Realizing that this had never been used in stage work he decided to have a triangular man chorus in place of The Pajama Man. That afternoon as he, Collin Davis and Hoschna sat together wondering what they would call the song, Sohlke kept repeating Pajama jama yama yama. Suddenly he brightened up and cried "Did either of you fellows ever hear of a Yama Yama Man?" Of course neither one had and Sohlke confirmed "Neither have I! Let's call the new song Yama Yama Man". Quickly Davis set to work to write a lyric around the title and that night Sohlke and Hoschna locked themselves in a room with Bessie McCoy and rehearsed the Yama song and dance for five hours.

== Influences and legacy ==
=== Peak popularity (1909–1920s) ===
Following Bessie McCoy's initial performances, the "Yama Yama Man" became a popular cultural fad. Ada Jones recorded "Yama Yama Man" in 1909 for Victor Light Opera Company. The lyrics for verse two and three were changed, verse two being more bawdy. It spent five weeks at #1 in 1909 and was the most popular song of her career. Other artists recorded variations of the song; in 1909, the Cuban dance orchestra Orquesta de Enrique Peña recorded a version in a traditional Cuban style, and Stanley Kirkby recorded a version around 1912 accompanied by banjo.

The Yama Yama Man
Ada Jones & Chorus, 1908

The Yama Yama Man
Ada Jones & Victor Light Opera Company, 1909

The Yama Yama Man
Orquesta De Enrique Pena, 1909

The character was recognizable enough to inspire costumes, which were sometimes worn by attendees at Halloween and masquerade parties. In 1918, animation pioneer Max Fleischer created a clown character based on a costume worn by his brother, Dave, who was a former Coney Island Clown. This clown character, which evolved into Koko the Clown in the famous Out of the Inkwell films, appears to owe much to the Yama Yama Girl costume. Both Koko and Bessie McCoy wore clothing of loose black material, with three large white pom-poms in front and a white-trimmed neck frill. Both wore white foot coverings, white gloves with long fingers, and a hat with the same white pom-pom as in front. A 1922 sheet music drawing makes the connection explicit, saying "Out of the Inkwell, the New Yama Yama Clown", showing a picture of Koko.

The character also appeared in literature of the era. Grace Duffie Boylan published a spin-off children's novel, Yama Yama Land, in 1909. F. Scott Fitzgerald briefly mentioned it in Book Two of his 1922 novel The Beautiful and Damned. Author William Manchester recalled in his 1980 memoir, Goodbye, Darkness, that as a youth in Virginia during the 1920s, his nanny threatened him with a bogeyman she called "the yama yama man".

=== Cinematic nostalgia (1930s–1940s) ===
By the late 1930s, the character appeared in Hollywood films as a callback to the early 20th century. In 1909, the young dancer Irene Foote began imitating Bessie McCoy's "Yama Yama Man" in amateur theatricals. Irene's mother would take her to Broadway producers, auditioning her talent using the Yama routine with little success. Irene later had a successful career in modern dance with her husband Vernon Castle. In 1939, Ginger Rogers played Irene in the biographical film The Story of Vernon and Irene Castle, in which Rogers re-enacts Irene imitating Bessie McCoy's "Yama Yama Man" routine during an audition. In Warner Brothers' Look For The Silver Lining (1949), June Haver plays Marilyn Miller imitating Ginger Rogers imitating Irene Foote imitating Bessie McCoy's performance.

=== 1960s revival ===
In 1967, actor George Segal released an LP titled The Yama Yama Man. The title track is a ragtime version with horns and banjos. Segal released the album due to his popularity performing the song on The Tonight Show Starring Johnny Carson.

== Lyrics ==
1.
Ev'ry little tot at night,
Is afraid of the dark you know.
Some big Yama man they see,
When off to bed they go.

Refrain:

Yama, Yama, the Yama man,
Terrible eyes and a face of tan.
If you don't watch out he'll get you without a doubt,
If he can.
Maybe he's hiding behind the chair,
Ready to spring out at you unaware.
Run to your mama,
For here comes the Yama Yama man.

2.
Great big scary eyes you see,
So you cover up your head.
But that Yama man is there,
Standing right beside your bed.

Refrain

3.
In the theater now today,
Ev'ry girl takes off her hat.
But that doesn't help a bit,
For you can't see 'round her rat.

Refrain

4.
Mister Harriman to-day,
Thinks he'll have to change his dish.
Fridays he says he'll stick to meat,
For he's getting sick of "Fish".

Refrain

5.
Lady coming up the street,
Holds her skirt up with hands so deft.
To do this she has a perfect right,
And she also has a darn good left.

Refrain

6.
The "Pay-as-you-enter" car,
Is the brightest scheme evolved.
They can't Miss a nickel now,
So the traction question's solved.

Refrain

== Meaning of lyrics ==
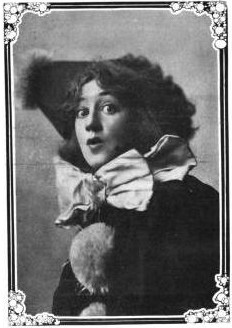
Bessie McCoy, 1908.

- Verse 1 & 2: About the subject of the song. These are the only two verses sung in the play; the remaining four verses were reserved for McCoy's inevitable encores.
- Verse 3: Ladies' fashion of the period involved elaborate hats arranged with stuffed birds, feathers, flowers and so on. Bouffant hairstyles, popular at the time, were sometimes made with "hair-rats", which were pads of old hair taken from brushes stuffed into the hairdo to create volume. They were a "dismaying sight to find in the theater seat directly ahead."
- Verse 4: The railroad tycoon Edward H. Harriman ("The Colossus of Roads") had a very public war of succession with Stuyvesant Fish over the Illinois Central Railroad around 1906.
- Verse 5: Right and left ankle or leg. Turn of the century skirts were normally very long and when women lifted their skirts in the street to prevent them from getting dirty, men might catch a glimpse of an ankle or leg underneath. As the 20th century progressed hemlines became progressively shorter.
- Verse 6: This is about the new "Pay-as-you-enter" street cars, where nickels were deposited by passengers in a machine when entering instead of being collected by a conductor. "Traction" was the general term for movement by locomotive car. The following letter to the editor of The New York Times (1909) illustrates:

It is quite some time since the trial and approval of the "pay-as-you-enter cars," and I fail to see why they have not been introduced on the Broadway line. A strong public sentiment favors these new and up-to-date cars, since they not only gather in the nickels, but they do away with crowding, shoving, jamming, and the abominable nuisance of the conductor, who used to throw people down and step over them in his eagerness to gather the coin that he paid over, or did not pay over, to the car companies.

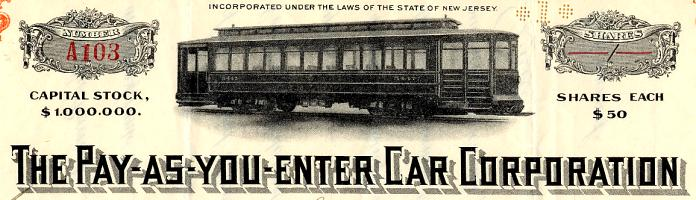
In 1909, the Pay-As-You-Enter Car Corp issued stock making it quite topical around the time of the song.
