= Ada Jones =

English-American singer

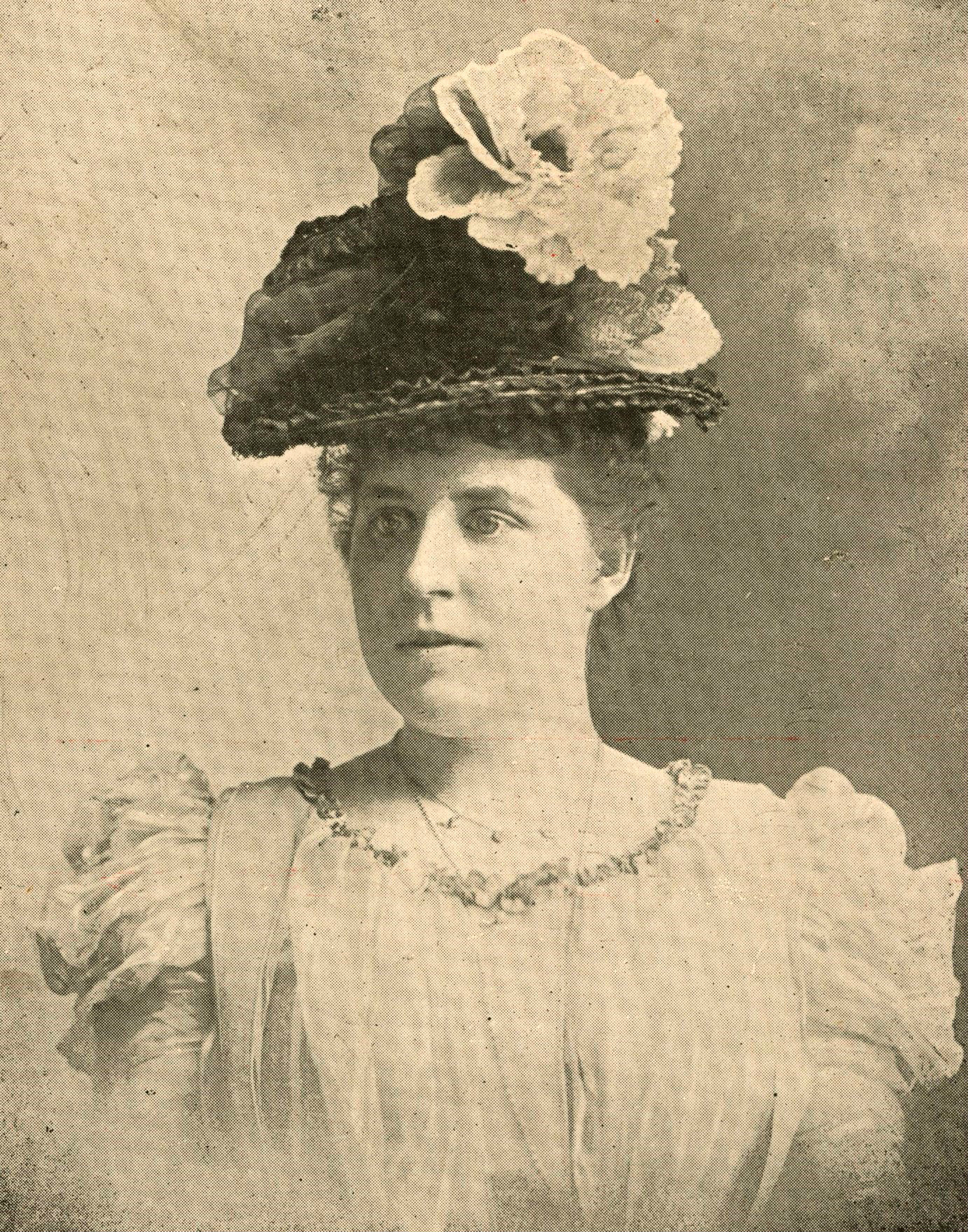
- Portrait of Jones, 1894

Background information
- Born: Ada Jane Jones; June 1, 1873; Lancashire, England
- Died: May 22, 1922 (aged 48) Rocky Mount, North Carolina, U.S.
- Genres: Vocal, ragtime, vaudeville, comedy
- Occupation: Singer
- Years active: 1889–1922
- Labels: North American Phonograph Company, Edison
- Formerly of: American Quartet

Ada Jane Jones (June 1, 1873 – May 2, 1922) was an English-American popular singer who made her first recordings in 1893 on Edison cylinders. She is among the earliest female singers to be recorded.

== Biography ==
Jones was born in Lancashire, UK, but moved with her family to Philadelphia, Pennsylvania, at the age of six, in 1879. She started performing on stage, including juvenile roles in the 1880s.

She sang in a contralto, learning songs by ear, and lacked the ability to read music or play an instrument. Her repertoire included ballads, ragtime, vaudeville, and comedy in a variety of dialects. During 1893–1894, she recorded for Edison Records on wax cylinders, making her among the earliest female singers to be recorded. She sang with Billy Murray, Billy Watkins, Cal Stewart, Len Spencer, the American Quartet, and with her 12-year-old daughter Sheilah. Touring was made difficult due to epilepsy.

In the 1890s, Jones recorded some musical performances for the North American Phonograph Company, including "Sweet Marie" and "The Volunteer Organist". However, the demise of this company interrupted her recording career, and it was not until 1905 that she returned to recording, after a few years doing performances at such locations as Huber's 14th Street Museum in New York City.

Jones recorded "The Yama Yama Man" in 1909 with the Victor Light Opera Company. The lyrics for verse two and three were changed from the original, verse two being more bawdy. It was the most popular song of her career, becoming a bestseller.

Jones died in Rocky Mount, North Carolina, on May 22, 1922, of kidney failure.

== Discography ==
- Ada Jones discography

== Songs ==
Dixie
Dixie by the Metropolitan Mixed Chorus with Ada Jones and Billy Murray, 1916

Shine On, Harvest Moon
"Shine On, Harvest Moon" by Ada Jones and Billy Murray, 1909

Whistle and I'll Wait for You
Solo recording, 1909

- "Sweet Marie" (c. 1893–94)
- "The Volunteer Organist" (c. 1893–94)
- "Please Come Play in My Yard" (1905)
- "I'm a Woman of Importance" (1906)
- "Don't Get Married Any More, Ma" (1906, 1907; multiple recordings)
- "Experience (from 'The Little Cherub')" (1906)
- "Peaches and Cream", Ada Jones and Len Spencer (Lowitz cylinder 1906)
- "All She Gets from the Iceman Is Ice" (1907)
- "If the Man in the Moon Were a Coon" (1907)
- "I Just Can't Make My Eyes Behave" (1907)
- "Now I Have to Call Him 'Father'" (1908)
- "I've Got Rings On My Fingers" (1909)
- "My Pony Boy" (1909)
- "The Yama Yama Man" (1909)
- "Whistle, and I'll Wait for You" (1909)
- "Call Me Up Some Rainy Afternoon" (1910)
- "Oh, You Candy Kid" (1910)
- "The Girl With the Brogue" (1910)
- "Whistle It" (1912) (with Peerless Quartet)
- "Down in Gossip Row" (1912 Victor 17056-B)
- "Row! Row! Row!" (1913)
- "Beatrice Fairfax, Tell Me What to Do!" (1915)

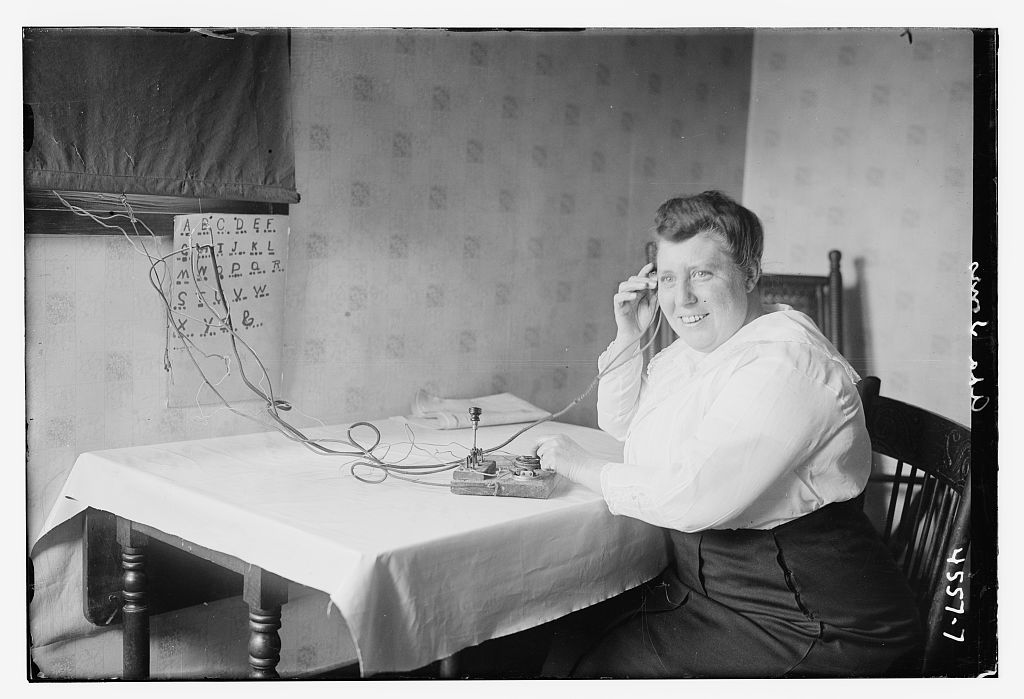
Ada Jones sending morse code in 1918

=== With Billy Murray ===
- "Under the Anheuser Bush" (Anheuser Busch Promotional)
- "Let's Take an Old-Fashioned Walk" (1907)
- "School Days" (1907)
- "Cuddle up a Little Closer, Lovey Mine" (1908)
- "The Boy Who Stuttered and the Girl Who Lisped" (1908)
- "Wouldn't You Like to Have Me for a Sweetheart?" (1908)
- "Blue Feather" (1909)
- "Can't You See I Love You" (1909) (Edison Standard Record: 10190)
- "Googy-oo" (1909) (Edison Amberol: 211)
- "I Can't Say You're the Only One" (1909) (Edison Standard Record: 10069)
- "Oh You Kid!" (1909) (Edison 10090)
- "Shine On, Harvest Moon" (1909)
- "Rainbow" (1909) (Columbia 10049)
- "Come Josephine in My Flying Machine" (1911)
- "My Hula Hula Love" (1911)
- "Be My Little Baby Bumble Bee" (1912)
- "Nora Malone (Call Me by Phone)" (1912)
- "Silver Bell" (1912)
- "If I Said 'Please'" (1913)
- "Snow Deer" (1913)
- "Somebody's Coming to My House" (1913)
- "Bedtime at the Zoo" (1914)
- "By the Beautiful Sea" (1914)
- "Dixie" (1916)
- "What Do You Want to Make Those Eyes at Me For?" (1917)
- "Some Sunday Morning" (1918)
- "When Frances Dances With Me" (1921)

== See also ==
- Ada Jones discography
- List of songs recorded by Ada Jones
- Billy Murray
- Len Spencer
