= John Bieling =

American tenor singer and pioneer recording artist

John H. Bieling
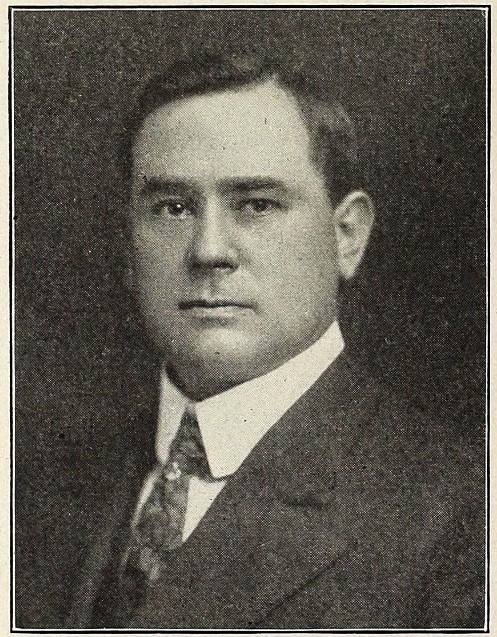
- Bieling, ca. 1914
- Born: John Henry Bieling; March 15, 1869; New York, New York, U.S.
- Died: March 30, 1948 (aged 79); Hempstead, New York, U.S.
- Other name: The Canary
- Occupation: Singer
- Years active: 1892-1926

John Henry Bieling (March 15, 1869 – March 30, 1948) was an American tenor singer who was a pioneer recording artist in the early years of the twentieth century. He featured on thousands of recordings, especially as a member of The Haydn Quartet and The American Quartet, two of the most popular vocal groups of the period.

== Biography ==
He was born in New York City, and started work in the 1880s in a stained glass factory. He also sang in vocal groups, and by the early 1890s was a member of the Manhansett (or Manhasset) Quartet, with George J. Gaskin, Joe Riley and Walter Snow. The quartet made its first recordings in 1892 for the United States Phonograph Company in Newark, New Jersey, and also recorded for many other early cylinder recording companies including Columbia and Edison. Bieling also recorded in the 1890s in a duo with Gaskin. His purity of tone led him to be nicknamed "The Canary".

In 1898, Bieling formed a new vocal group, with Samuel Holland Rous (who performed as S. H. Dudley), Jere Mahoney, and William F. Hooley. Mahoney was soon replaced by John Scantlebury Macdonald, who used the pseudonym Harry Macdonough. They recorded as the Edison Male Quartet for Edison, before taking the name The Haydn Quartet in order to record for other companies. In 1901 they began recording for Victor Records, and had great success over the next decade as one of the premier recording groups of the time. The Haydn Quartet's biggest commercial successes included "In the Good Old Summer Time" (1903), "Bedelia" (1904), "Sweet Adeline (You're the Flower of My Heart)" (1904), "How'd You Like To Spoon With Me" (with Corinne Morgan, 1906), "Take Me Out to the Ball Game" (with Billy Murray, 1908), "Sunbonnet Sue" (1908), "Put On Your Old Gray Bonnet" (1909), and "By the Light of the Silv'ry Moon" (with Murray, 1910).

As well as his group performances, Bieling recorded successfully as a solo singer. His successes included "In the Sweet Bye and Bye" (1903) and "Over the Hills and Far Away" (1908). Bieling also recorded as a member of The American Quartet. This was formed in 1909 by the Victor company, essentially to provide a new showcase for their star singer, Billy Murray, who took the lead role. The other group members, with Murray and Bieling, were Steve Porter and William F. Hooley. Many of the American Quartet's early recordings were of "cowboy songs", a vogue of the time. The group's recordings again became hugely popular, their early successes including "Casey Jones" (1910), "Call Me Up Some Rainy Afternoon" (with Ada Jones, 1910), "Oh, You Beautiful Doll" (1911), and "Moonlight Bay" (1912).

In 1911, Victor formed another group featuring Bieling, the Heidelberg Quintet, which also contained Murray, Porter, Hooley, and counter-tenor Will Oakland, and had success with "Waiting for the Robert E. Lee" (1912). However, Bieling's voice began to suffer through overwork, and the requirement on him to make cowboy whoops on some of his records, particularly during a 1910 recording session for Edison which damaged his vocal cords. At the time, many studio takes were required to produce sufficient copies of a recording to satisfy public demand. In mid-1913 Bieling decided to give up singing.

Bieling then went to work in Victor Records' sales department. He later left the company and became a dealer in Victrola phonographs. He retired in 1926, and moved to live in Hempstead, Long Island.

Later in life, Bieling led gatherings of individuals who had made early phonograph recordings. The gatherings were christened "John Bieling Day" after his death.

He died in Hempstead in 1948, at the age of 79.
