= Jim Walsh (columnist) =

American journalist

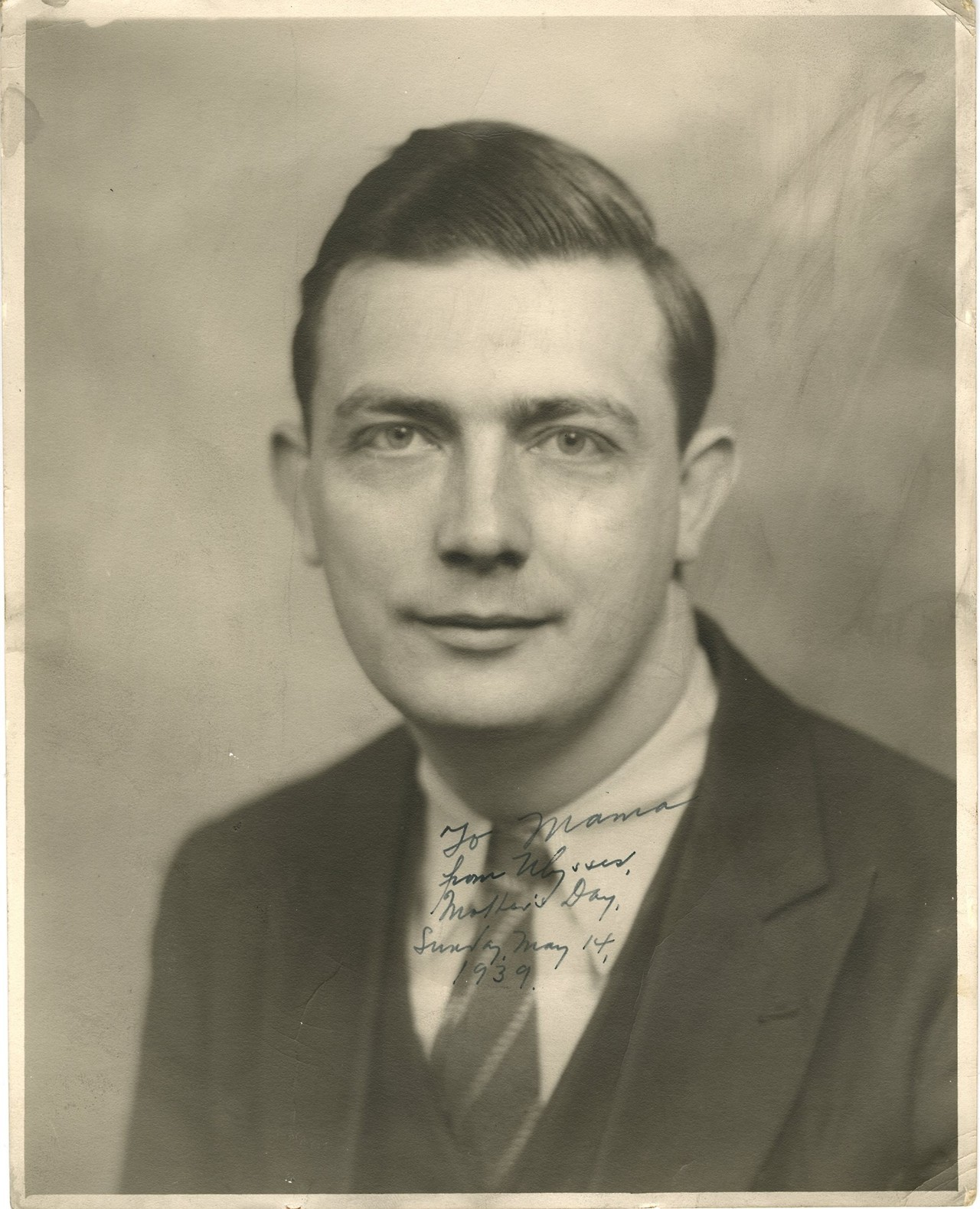
Portrait of Walsh ca. 1939 from Jim Walsh Collection, Library of Congress

Ulysses "Jim" Walsh (July 20, 1903 – December 24, 1990) was an American record collector, columnist and radio broadcaster. He was the leading authority on early recording artists of the late 19th and early 20th centuries, and their techniques, especially through his columns written between the 1920s and 1980s, most notably for Hobbies magazine.

== Biography ==
He was born in Richmond, Virginia, and was named after Ulysses S. Grant. After living for periods in Durham, North Carolina, and in South Boston, Virginia, he went to school and grew up in the small town of Marion. As a boy, he was generally known as "E"; he acquired the nickname "Jim", which he used for the rest of his life, after he started work.

He recorded on a phonograph cylinder as a boy soprano, and as a teenager started to collect and research the recordings of his childhood and earlier years. He first submitted articles for publication in local newspapers and specialist magazines in the late 1920s. In 1929 he began work in the music department of a furniture store in Marion, before taking a job as a post office clerk in the town in 1932.

Between 1934 and 1943 he worked as a newspaper reporter in Johnson City, Tennessee, and in 1939 also began hosting a program on radio station WJHL, which showcased old recordings from his collection, and allowed him to discuss the lives and accomplishments of the musicians. He started writing a column, "Favorite Pioneer Recording Artists," for Hobbies magazine in 1942. The articles concentrated on popular - rather than classical - recordings made before 1909, though their scope later widened to cover recordings made before the introduction of electronic recording in the mid-1920s. He continued writing articles for Hobbies until 1985. In later years, as the recognised authority on early popular recordings, he also wrote columns on the subject for Variety, The New Yorker, and many other magazines.

In 1943 he joined the staff of the Roanoke World News, and began working on the local radio stations WDBJ and later WSLS, where he continued to broadcast until 1960. He also continued to collect records and recording equipment, and met or corresponded with many of those involved in the early recording industry. He listed his favorite recording artists as Billy Murray, Henry Burr, Ada Jones, Len Spencer, Arthur Collins, Byron G. Harlan, Harry Macdonough, Albert Campbell, Frank C. Stanley, Steve Porter, Billy Golden, S. H. Dudley, Dan W. Quinn, William F. Hooley, and Cal Stewart. He started, but never completed, a comprehensive history of early recordings and techniques. However, his voluminous articles continue to be regarded as the most important source of information on recordings of the period.

In 1965 he began transferring much of his collection to the Library of Congress. In all, he contributed some 40,000 discs - including an almost complete run of over 5,000 Edison "Diamond Disc" records - together with 500 cylinders, 23 early phonographs, extensive correspondence, research notes, clippings, photographs, radio broadcast scripts and miscellaneous ephemera.

Walsh died in 1990, after many years of declining health. He was unmarried, and devoted to his cats. In 1991 he was posthumously awarded the first Lifetime Achievement Award of the Association for Recorded Sound Collections (ARSC).
