= American Quartet (ensemble) =

Early 20th century vocal quartet

The American Quartet
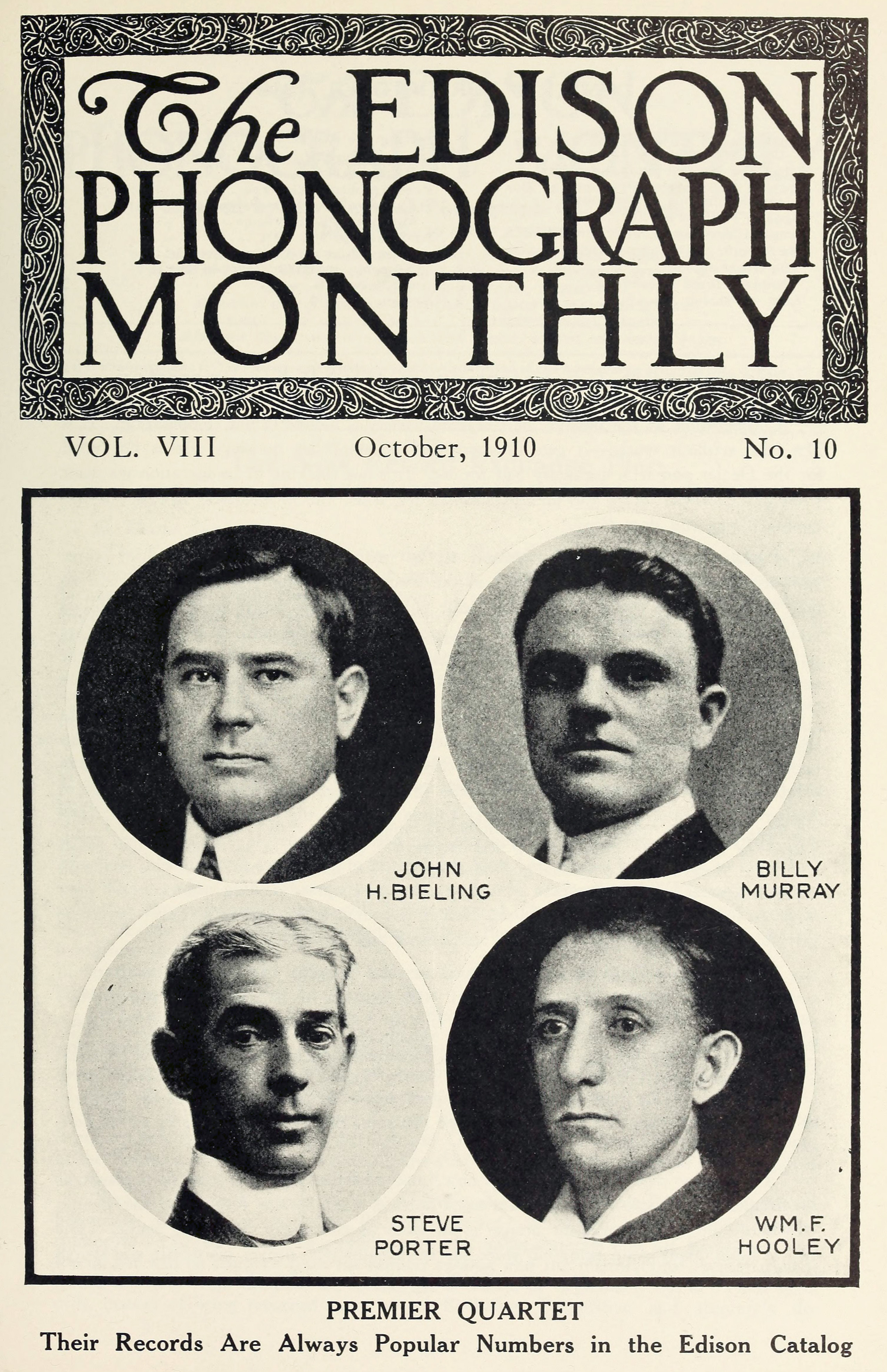

Background information
- Also known as: The Premier Quartet(te); The Premier American Quartet
- Origin: New York City, United States
- Genres: Vocal group
- Years active: 1899–1925
- Labels: Victor, Edison, Columbia, etc.
- Past members: John Bieling; William F. Hooley; S. H. Dudley; Jere Mahoney; Harry Macdonough; Albert C. Campbell; W. T. Leahy; Billy Murray; Steve Porter; Walter B. Rogers; Robert D. Armour; John Young; Donald Chalmers; John H. Meyer; Frank Croxton (NOTE: Core members 1909-1913 in bold.)

The American Quartet was a four-member vocal group that recorded for various companies in the United States between 1899 and 1925. The membership varied over the years, but the most famous line-up – John Bieling (first tenor), Billy Murray (second tenor), Steve Porter (baritone), and William F. Hooley (bass) – recorded for the Victor Talking Machine Company from 1909 to 1913. The same group of singers also recorded for Edison Records as the Premier Quartet (or Quartette), and for that and other labels as the Premier American Quartet. From 1912 to 1914 the quartet also recorded with countertenor Will Oakland as the Heidelberg Quintet.

== History ==
The name "American Quartet" was first used on some recordings around 1899 by the group that became more widely known as the Haydn Quartet - that is, John Bieling, Jere Mahoney, S. H. Dudley, and William F. Hooley. That line-up recorded for Edison Records as the Edison Male Quartet, for Berliner as the Haydn Quartet, and for other companies as the American Quartet. After Harry Macdonough replaced Mahoney, the name was used by Edison on some of the group's recordings. Another line-up credited with the same name comprised Albert C. Campbell, W. T. Leahy, Dudley, and Hooley, on recordings for Victor from 1901.

The best known line-up of the quartet was formed in 1909, when Victor Records needed a vehicle for their new singing star, Billy Murray. They formed a group around Murray, with Bieling and Hooley brought in from the Haydn Quartet (in which they continued to sing), and Steve Porter from the Peerless Quartet. Their debut release, "Denver Town", in the then-popular "cowboy song" genre, was released in February 1909 and, like many of the group's recordings, was arranged (and in this case co-written) by George L. Botsford. The group also recorded the song for Edison, where it was credited to the Premier Quartette; the record company claimed that Will Oakland sang on the record rather than Macdonough, but according to Jim Walsh this was probably an error.

In 1910, the group recorded "Casey Jones", with Victor Records orchestra leader Walter B. Rogers temporarily replacing Steve Porter. The song was very successful, "perhaps the first recording to sell over a million copies in American music history". "Casey Jones" was also recorded by Billy Murray, with a chorus, for Edison Records as one of their "Blue Amberol" series. The group's recordings became hugely popular, their other early successes including "Call Me Up Some Rainy Afternoon" (with Ada Jones, 1910), "Come, Josephine, In My Flying Machine" (also with Jones, 1911), "Oh, You Beautiful Doll" (1911), "Moonlight Bay" (1912), and "Everybody Two-Step" (1912).

Bieling left the group in mid-1913 because of the strain on his voice, which worsened when he was required to make "cowboy whoops" on some records. He was replaced by Robert D. Armour, a young tenor from Mobile, Alabama. Armour then left in mid-1915, and was replaced by John Young, who had previously recorded under the name Harry Anthony. The group continued to make successful recordings, including "Rebecca of Sunny-brook Farm" (1914), "It's A Long, Long Way To Tipperary" (1914), "Chinatown, My Chinatown" (1915), "Oh Johnny, Oh Johnny, Oh!" (1917), "Over There" (1917), and "Turkestan" (1919).

William Hooley died in October 1918, a victim of the 1918 flu pandemic. The group continued thereafter, with Hooley replaced by bass singer Donald Chalmers who, like Young, had been a member of the Criterion Quartet. After Murray's exclusive contract with Victor expired, the group of Murray, Porter, Young and Chalmers recorded for many companies, including Edison, Columbia, and Okeh, before retiring as a recording entity in 1920.

Singer and entrepreneur Henry Burr then proposed that Murray should replace him in the Peerless Quartet, and that the new group - Murray, Albert Campbell, John H. Meyer, and Frank Croxton - should record for Victor, as the American Quartet. This was agreed; the group signed exclusively to Victor, with Murray and Burr receiving $35,000 each per year, and Campbell, Meyer, and Croxton $10,000 each. The new group had some success with songs such as "In The Little Red School House" (1922), but at a much lower level than previously. Some of the group's later recordings were recorded by Murray with Porter, Young and Chalmers, rather than with the new line-up. The group's final recording, "Alabamy Bound", was recorded in 1925, just before Victor switched from acoustic to electrical recording; the Quartet did not record with the new technology.
