= List of Victor Records artists =

A partial listing of recording artists who formerly recorded for Victor Talking Machine Company (known in most of the world as Victor Records prior to 1946) include the following list. Included are artists on Victor's subsidiary label, Bluebird Records.

Please make a note if recordings were only leased from another label, this page should basically only list recording artists.

== A ==
- Irving Aaronson and his Commanders
- Abbott & Costello
- Louis Armstrong
- Mrs. William Asher
- Gene Autry

== B ==
- Count Basie
- Samuel Barber
- Leonard Bernstein
- Benson Orchestra of Chicago
- Jimmy Blanton
- Blue Ridge Corn Shuckers
- Ishmon Bracey
- Rabbit Brown
- Barney Bigard
- Leon "Chu" Berry
- Sidney Bechet
- Big Bill Broonzy
- Bix Beiderbecke
- Boston Symphony Orchestra
- Six Brown Brothers
- Scrapper Blackwell

== C ==
- The Carolina Tar Heels
- Harry Carney
- Hoagy Carmichael
- Enrico Caruso
- Fiddlin' John Carson
- Arthur "Big Boy" Crudup
- Bing Crosby
- Blanche Calloway
- Cab Calloway
- Blind Clyde Church - blues musician
- Leroy Carr
- Bo Carter
- Carter Family
- Wilf Carter
- Chicago Hot Five
- Charlie Christian
- Nat King Cole (as the King Cole Trio)
- Collins & Harlan
- Coon
- Cozy Cole
- George M. Cohan
- Joan Crawford
- Giuseppe Creatore
- Perry Como
- Eddie Condon
- Arthur Collins (singer)
- Russ Colombo
- Xavier Cugat

== D ==
- Vernon Dalhart
- Julius Daniels
- Walter Davis
- The Delmore Brothers
- Jimmy Dorsey
- Tommy Dorsey
- Disney Film Soundtracks - Snow White and the Seven Dwarfs, Pinocchio, Dumbo, Bambi
- Marguerite Dunlap
- Bernardo De Pace

== E ==
- Sleepy John Estes
- Harry "Sweets" Edison
- Duke Ellington

== F ==
- Geraldine Farrar
- Ella Fitzgerald

== G ==
- George Gershwin
- Alma Gluck
- Dizzy Gillespie
- Benny Goodman
- Jean Goldkette
- Lil Green
- Stéphane Grappelli
- Freddie Green
- Woody Guthrie

== H ==
- Adelaide Hall
- Lionel Hampton
- Morton Harvey
- Coleman Hawkins
- Haydn Quartet
- Fletcher Henderson
- Earl "Fatha" Hines
- Dan Hornsby
- Johnny Hodges
- Lena Horne
- Alberta Hunter
- Billie Holiday

== I ==
- The Ink Spots

== J ==
- Harry James
- Al Jolson
- Charley Jordan
- Luke Jordan
- Lonnie Johnson
- James P. Johnson
- Tommy Johnson
- Miss Jones
- Jascha Heifetz

== K ==
- Roger Wolfe Kahn
- Barney Kessel
- Gene Krupa

== L ==
- Eddie Lang
- Harry Lauder
- Lead Belly
- Charlie Lemon
- Furry Lewis
- Charles Lindbergh
- Little Mix

== M ==
- Christie MacDonald
- Harry Macdonough (Macdonough)
- Uncle Dave Macon
- Lucy Isabelle Marsh
- Tommy McClennan
- Harry McClintock
- John McCormack
- McKinney's Cotton Pickers
- Memphis Jug Band
- Memphis Minnie
- Carmen Miranda
- Big Maceo
- Hal Mcintyre
- Blind Willie McTell
- Bill Monroe
- Corinne Morgan (Miss Morgan)
- Jelly Roll Morton
- Oscar Moore
- Vaughn Monroe
- Bennie Moten
- Billy Murray
- Moonshine Kate
- Glenn Miller

== N ==
- Ray Noble
- Sonny Boy Nelson
- Tricky Sam Nanton

== O ==
- King Oliver
- Ester Olsen
- Original Dixieland Jazz Band
- Eugene Ormandy

== P ==
- Oran "Hot Lips" Page
- Walter Page
- Cole Porter
- Ignacy Jan Paderewski
- Oscar Peterson
- Paul Whiteman and His Orchestra

== Q ==
- Agnes Clune Quinlan

== R ==
- Yank Rachell
- Sergei Rachmaninoff
- Homer Rodeheaver
- Buddy Rich
- Ted Fio Rito
- Django Reinhardt
- Carson Robison
- Paul Robeson
- Jimmie Rodgers
- Roy Rogers
- Jimmy Rushing

== S ==
- Sanders
- Artie Shaw
- Nathaniel Shilkret
- Dinah Shore
- Monroe Silver
- Frank Sinatra
- Mamie Smith
- John Philip Sousa (Sousa's Band)
- Frank C. Stanley (Stanley)
- Frank Stokes
- Ernest Stoneman
- Hank Snow
- Pinetop Sparks
- Mr. Spencer
- Roosevelt Sykes recorded as Willie Kelly
- Roy Smeck
- Pablo de Sarasate

== T ==
- Tampa Red
- Jack Teagarden
- Tietge Sisters
- Arturo Toscanini
- Trinity Choir
- Frankie Trumbauer
- Bessie Tucker
- Ernest Tubb

== V ==
- Joe Venuti
- Victor Military Band
- Victor Orchestra

== W ==
- Fats Waller
- Washboard Sam
- George P. Watson
- Paul Whiteman
- Peetie Wheatstraw
- Henry Whitter
- Ben Webster
- Fess Williams and his Royal Flush Orchestra
- Bukka White - recorded as Washington White
- Cootie Williams
- Big Joe Williams
- Sonny Boy Williamson I
- Ted Weems
- Casey Bill Weldon recorded as Will Weldon

== U.S. Presidents ==
- Theodore Roosevelt
- William Howard Taft
- Woodrow Wilson
- Warren G. Harding
- Calvin Coolidge
- Herbert Hoover
- Franklin D. Roosevelt

== See also ==
- Victor Talking Machine Company
