= Estella Louise Mann =

American singer and record executive (1871–1947)

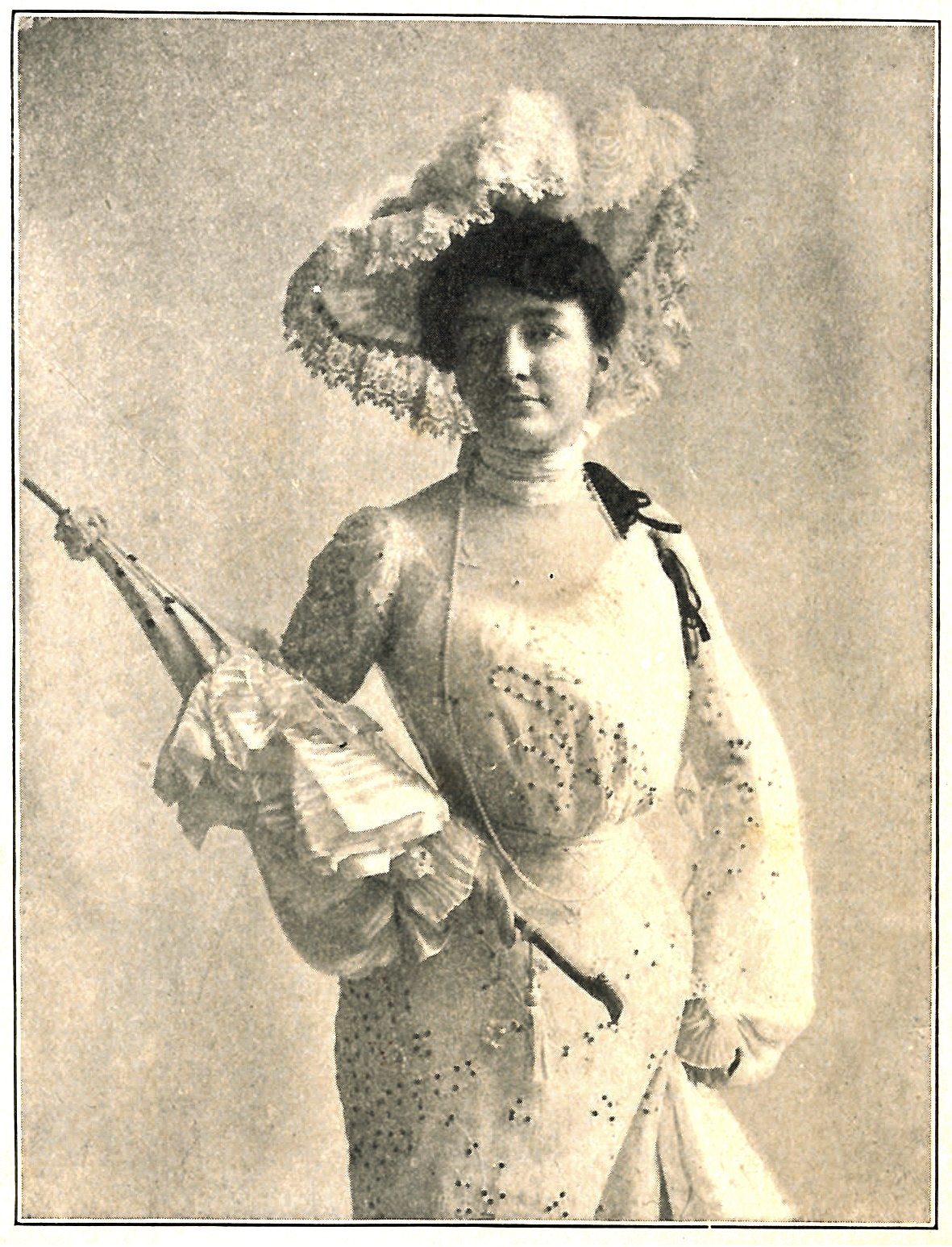

Background information
- Born: November 1, 1871; Nashville, Tennessee, US
- Died: August 20, 1947 (aged 75) Evansville, Indiana, US
- Occupations: Singer, recording artist, record executive
- Years active: 1892-1905
- Label: Lyric Phonograph Co.

Estella Louise Mann (November 1, 1871 – August 20, 1947) was an American singer, recording artist, and record executive active in New York in the 1890s. She was one of the first women to make a living as a recording artist, and the first woman to run a record company.

== Biography ==
Mann was born on November 1, 1871, in Nashville, Tennessee, to Eugene and Maria Mann. She studied vocal performance with Tino Mattioli at the College of Music of Cincinnati in the early 1890s, gaining a certificate in 1893 and a diploma in 1894. She toured briefly as a soloist with Sousa's Band then moved to New York to sing for concerts and opera. At the time, New York was the center of a boom of independent record companies supplying musical records for phonographs and graphophones, which were just beginning to be sold for home listening (rather than phonograph parlors).

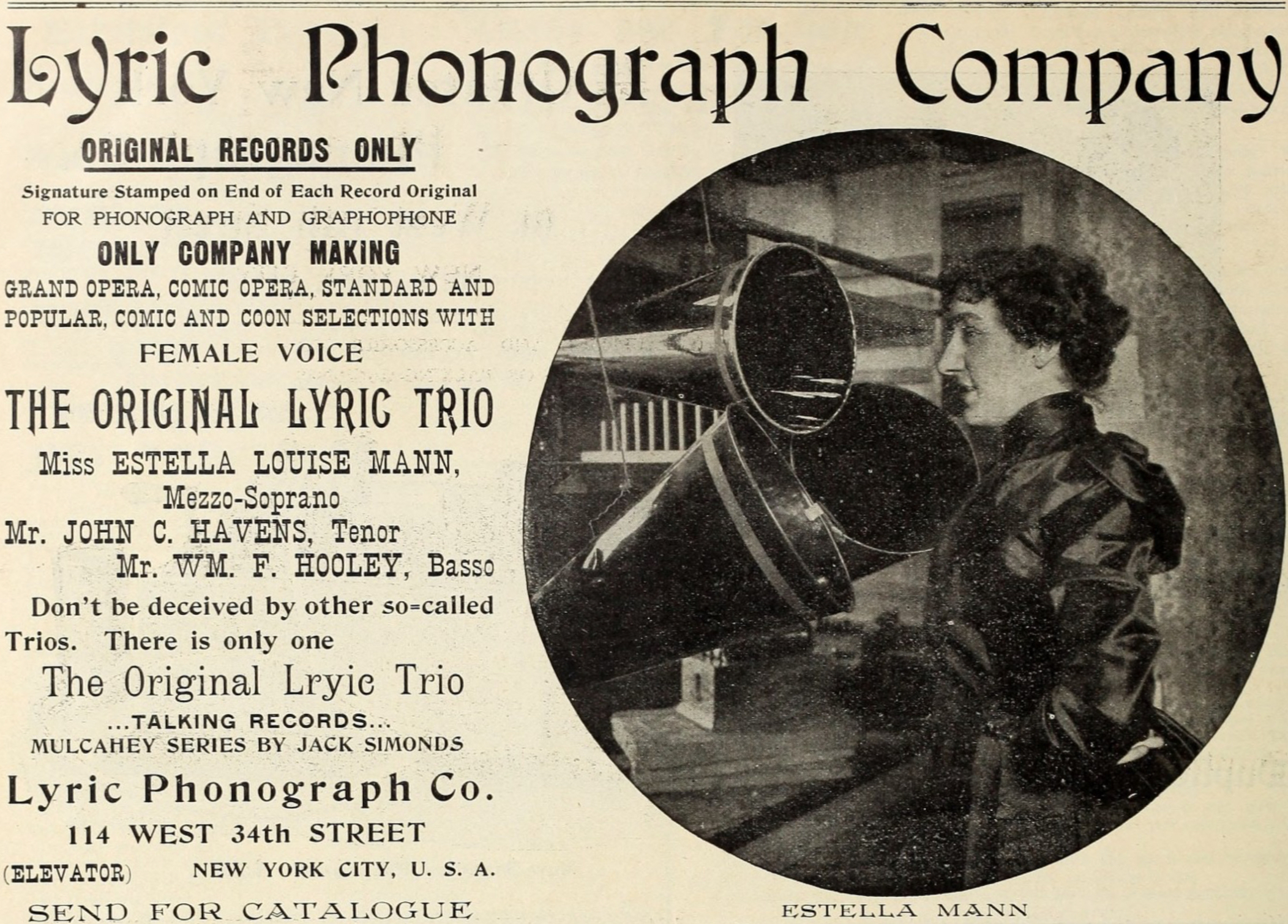
Lyric Phonograph Company advertisement in The Phonoscope (magazine), October 1898

In early 1898 she and her singing partner John C. Havens formed the Lyric Phonograph Company. The company showcased records of the Lyric Trio (of Mann, Havens, and bass William F. Hooley) singing opera, comic opera and concert solos, duets and trios. By September of the same year, the company had begun shipping records abroad, had begun recording other artists such as Joseph Weber and Jack Simonds, and had opened a branch office in San Francisco. The company moved to an expanded headquarters in early 1899 and added band, violin, organ, mandolin and other types of records to their catalog throughout the year.

The Lyric Phonograph Co. was still advertising in Phonoscope through May 1900, but Harry Macdonough had replaced Havens as tenor and Grace Spencer had replaced Mann as soprano. The boom of independent phonograph companies had largely bust as Edison and Columbia streamlined and expanded record manufacture and regained control of this aspect of the industry. Mann recorded 13 disc sides for the Berliner and Zonophone companies in 1899 and 1900, then returned to touring, singing opera with Eugenia Mantelli's Grand Opera Company, and singing comic opera and vaudeville.

Mann retired from performance "in her early thirties" (approximately 1905) according to her brother William, whom Jim Walsh interviewed in 1950 for an article in "Favorite Pioneer Recording Artists". She cared for her aging mother in Evansville, Indiana, then died decades later at her brother's house in the same town, though nothing is said about her life in the intervening years.

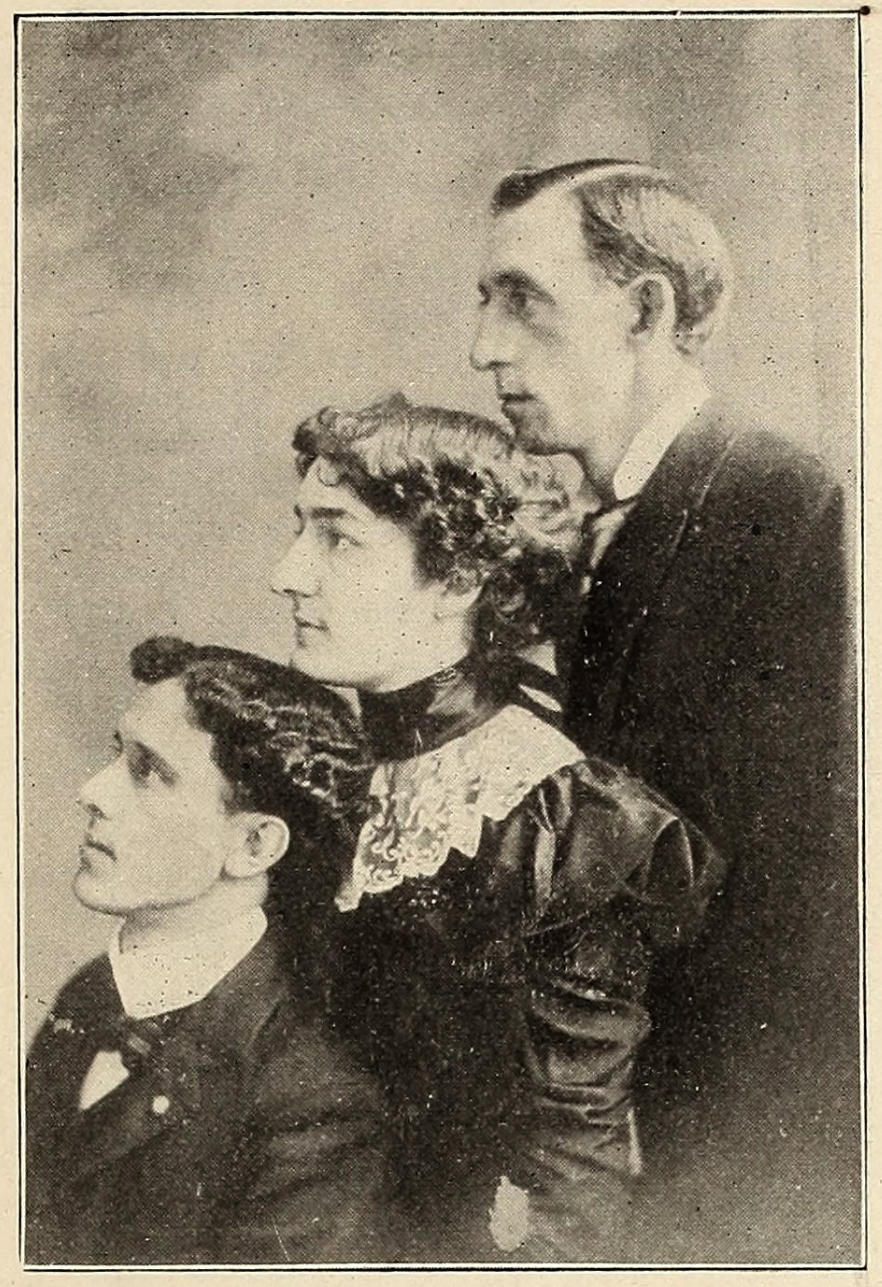
1898 portrait of the original Lyric Trio from Phonoscope

== See also ==
- Ada Jones
- Minnie Emmett
