= Roger Harding (singer) =

Irish-American singer, composer and music publisher

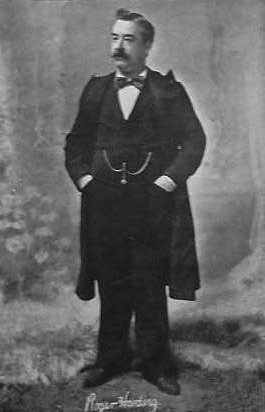

Background information
- Birth name: Roger Elias Harding Jr.
- Born: 1858; Kentucky
- Died: August 29, 1901; Brooklyn, N.Y.
- Occupation(s): Musician, Composer, Music publisher
- Years active: 1896-1901
- Labels: Excelsior Phonograph Company, Columbia Phonograph Company, Berliner Gramophone, Victor Records

Roger Harding (1858 – August 29, 1901) was an American singer, composer and music publisher active in the United States from 1890 to 1901.

== Biography ==
Harding was born in Kentucky in 1858 to Roger Elias Harding, Sr. and Virginia Ford Harding. Per census records, the family moved to Saint Louis by 1870. In the mid-1880s, Harding married Charlotte Oakley. The Hardings had two children, Ethel and Roger, who were both born in New York City.

In June 1890, Harding performed in the musical play Billie Taylor in New York City as part of the Ideal Opera Company. In March 1893, he played Nixey Weld in A Night at the Circus at the Harrigan's Park Theatre in New York. Also in 1893 he joined the minstrel company of Sam Devere, author of "The Whistling Coon" made famous by George W. Johnson.

In 1897, Harding began manufacturing phonograph records at 18 E. 22nd St., New York, and late in the year sold the operation to the Excelsior Phonograph Company (later Excelsior and Musical Phonograph Company). Harding continued managing recording for the Excelsior company until August of the following year, when he was replaced in that role by fellow recording artist William F. Hooley. He began recording around this time for the Columbia Phonograph Company (which had relocated from Washington, D.C. to New York City), Berliner Gramophone and National Phonograph Company (Edison). In addition to his own solo recordings of popular songs, Harding sang duets with Len Spencer, Steve Porter, Minnie Emmett and Myra Price, and was a member of the Spencer Trio, Imperial Minstrels and Greater New York Quartette.

By 1898, Harding had become associated with the Strakosch and Hess Grand English Opera Company and the Nellie McHenry Company, managing stage production and choirs as well as singing. In late 1898, Harding formed the Knickerbocker Music Publishing Company in New York with singer Steve Porter and pianist Fred Hylands, but the company was reformed as Hylands, Spencer and Yeager (with Len Spencer and Harry Yeager) in early 1899, apparently before any publishing commenced. In mid-1899, Harding began his own music publishing firm at 1180 Broadway, New York, then 53 W. 28th St., New York in Tin Pan Alley. In June 1901, Harding made his last recordings, for the Victor Talking Machine Company. By August 1901 Harding had moved his publishing business to the Johnson Building in Brooklyn, and died suddenly at this workplace on August 29, due to a viral infection. Harding is buried at Maple Grove Cemetery in Queens.

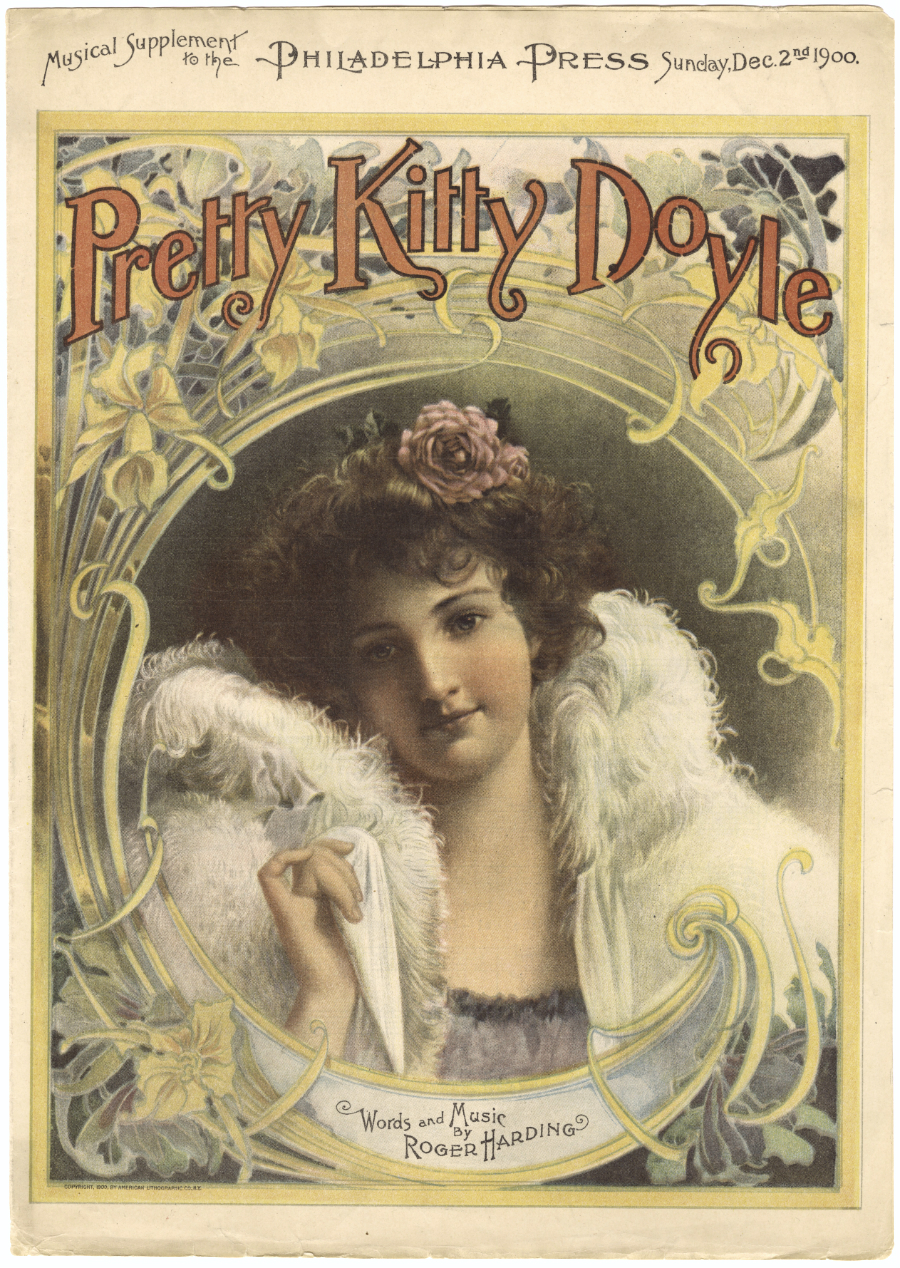
Sheet music cover for "Pretty Kitty Doyle", composed by Roger Harding, published by T.B. Harms in 1896.

== Compositions ==
- Save the Ship, Messmates (1891)
- I'll Take Care of You, Grandma (1892)
- Hush, Little Darling (1892)
- The Same Sweet Face (1895)
- Pretty Kitty Doyle (1896)
- Old Door Bell (1896)
- Don't Drive Your Child From Your Door (1897)
- Neta, My Love (1897)
- Norah Maloy (1897)
- A No 'Count Nigger Boy (1897)
- My Sunny Southern Home (1899)
- My Love's the Same (1899)
- 'Tis Best for Us to Part (1899)
- Pretty Kitty Clover (1899)
- Mamie Tracy (1899)
- I'll Love You Forever and Ever (1900)
- Ain't I Your Baby Anymore (1900)
- In the South Before the War (1900)
- That's my Gal (1900)
- You Don't Want Me (1900)
- That Grand Amen (1901)

== See also ==
- Len Spencer
- Steve Porter
- George J. Gaskin
