= Manhansett Quartet =

American vocal group

The Manhansett Quartet or Quartette, or Manhasset Quartet, was an American vocal group. It was the first such group to make commercial recordings in its own name, between about 1891 and 1901.

The group formed in the Bowery area of New York City, and originally comprised George J. Gaskin, Gilbert Girard, Joe Riley, and a fourth member remembered only as Evans. Tenor singer John Bieling became a member in 1894. The group made its first cylinder recordings in 1891 for the New Jersey Phonograph Company, which in 1893 merged and formed the United States Phonograph Company in Newark, New Jersey, and then recorded for many companies over the next decade including Edison and Columbia.

According to Joel Whitburn, the quartet's most commercially successful recordings included "The Picture Turned Towards The Wall" and "Sally In Our Alley" (both 1891), and "The Old Oaken Bucket" (1894).

The group dissolved about 1901, by which time Gaskin already had a well-established career as one of the era's leading recording artists, and Bieling had become a member of the Haydn Quartet. Gilbert Girard also continued a successful recording and performing career, especially in a duo with Len Spencer in which Girard used his talents for mimicking animal and bird sounds.
