= On Moonlight Bay =

On Moonlight Bay may refer to:

- Moonlight Bay, a 1912 popular song by Percy Wenrich and Edward Madden, commonly referred to as "On Moonlight Bay"
- On Moonlight Bay (film), a 1951 musical film starring Doris Day, with the above as its title song
- On Moonlight Bay (album), a 1951 album by Doris Day, containing songs from the soundtrack of the film, including the title song
