= William F. Hooley =

British-born American bass singer and pioneer recording artist

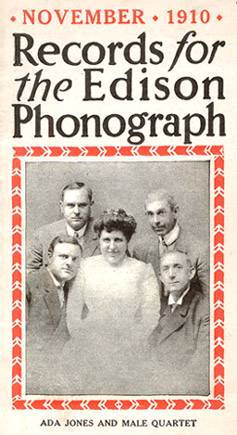
- Photoportrait of singers Ada Jones (seated center) and "Male Quartet" on Edison Records catalog supplement for November 1910. Quartet of singers surrounding Jones are identified as "clockwise from bottom left: Billy Murray, John Bieling, Steve Porter, and William F. Hooley".
- Born: April 16, 1861; Whitechapel, London, United Kingdom
- Died: October 12, 1918 (aged 57)
- Occupation: Recording artist
- Years active: 1896-1918

William F. Hooley (16 April 1861 – 12 October 1918) was a British-born American bass singer and pioneer recording artist who was popular as a solo singer, as a monologist, and as a member of several of the most successful vocal groups of the early twentieth century, including The Haydn Quartet and The American Quartet.

== Biography ==
Hooley was born in Whitechapel, London, England, to a family of Irish origin. Although his son claimed that William was born in Cork, Ireland, a suggestion repeated elsewhere, the claim is disproved by other evidence. He moved to the US as a child, and lived at first in Lynn, Massachusetts, later moving to Nyack, New York.

He sang in church choirs, glee clubs and operettas from the 1880s, and from about 1896 began recording as part of the Edison Quartet, with John Bieling, Samuel Holland Rous (who performed as S. H. Dudley), and Jere Mahoney. After Mahoney was replaced by John Scantlebury Macdonald, who used the pseudonym Harry Macdonough, they took the name The Haydn Quartet in order to record for companies other than Edison. Hooley was also, for a short time, the manager of the Excelsior Phonograph Company and then the president of the American Phonograph Company, makers of phonograph cylinders. However, neither venture was successful.

He made solo recordings, both as a bass singer — finding commercial success with his rendition of the "Gypsy Love Song" from the Broadway musical The Fortune Teller in 1899 — and as a monologist. In 1899 he recorded popular recitations of the "Sermon on the Mount", "Mother Goose Rhymes," and "Death and Burial of Cock Robin." The following year he recorded "Lincoln's Speech at Gettysburg", and a series of recordings for children in which he recited fairy stories. Hooley was also a member of the Lyric Trio, which initially comprised himself, John C. Havens and Estella Mann, and later, after 1901, consisted of Hooley, Harry Macdonough and Grace Spencer.

Hooley also recorded as a member of The American Quartet. This was formed in 1909 by Victor Records to provide a new showcase for their star singer, Billy Murray, who took the lead role. The other group members, with Murray and Hooley, were John Bieling and Steve Porter. The group's recordings again became popular, their early successes including "Casey Jones" (1910), "Call Me Up Some Rainy Afternoon" (with Ada Jones, 1910), "Oh, You Beautiful Doll" (1911), and "Moonlight Bay" (1912). From 1914, Hooley also recorded as part of the Orpheus Quartet, which included Harry Macdonough, Reinald Werrenrath, and Lambert Murphy; and as a member of the Heidelberg Quintet, which comprised the four members of the American Quartet together with counter-tenor Will Oakland.

Hooley made his final recordings in August 1918. He died later that year, "suddenly and inexplicably". at the age of 57.
