= Minnie Emmett =

American singer and recording artist

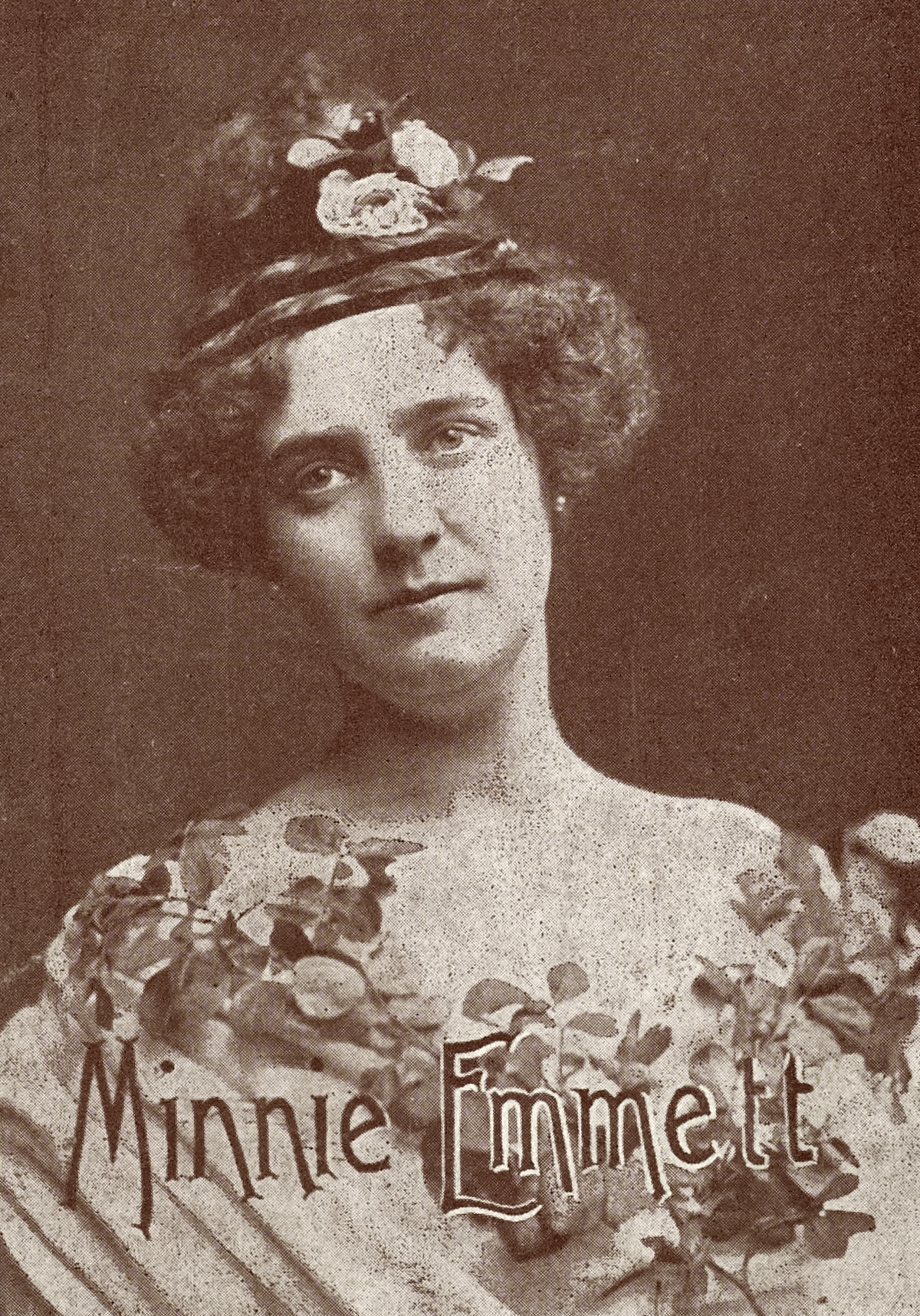
Minnie Emmett, ca. 1901.

Minnie Emmett was a singer and pioneer recording artist active in New York in the 1890s and 1900s.

Emmett was not the first woman to make commercial records, but was the first to gain prominence and influence in the field. A July 1898 article in Phonoscope called her "the most successful and the most popular woman engaged in record making". Her first recordings, published by the United States Phonograph Company in 1894 or 1895, were advertised as "the first true records of a high soprano voice". She sang popular sentimental and comic songs like "Sweet Marie" and "The Sunshine of Paradise Alley" and remained in the United States catalog until joining the Columbia Phonograph Company in 1898 and adding operatic solos and duets (with Roger Harding) and older standards (Ben Bolt, Robin Adair, Foster's songs) to her repertoire. She continued recording into the early 1900s, making discs for Columbia and Victor of similar material. She recorded a few cylinders for the U.S. Everlasting company around 1910.

Emmett also sang in productions of the Duquesne Garden Stock Opera Company and the Graw Opera Company.

Though many details of her personal life are unclear, recording pioneer Albert Campbell told researcher Jim Walsh that he'd seen Emmett in a home for retired actors in the late 1930s.

== See also ==
- Ada Jones
