= Walter B. Rogers =

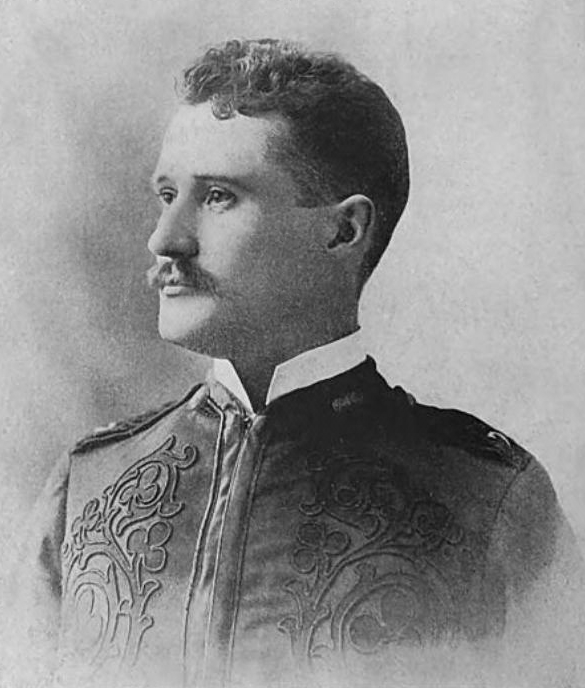

Background information
- Born: Walter Bowman Rogers; October 14, 1865; Delphi, Indiana, United States
- Died: December 24, 1939 (aged 74) New York City, New York, United States
- Genres: Vaudeville, marching band, classical
- Occupations: Cornetist, bandleader, conductor
- Instruments: Cornet, violin
- Years active: c. 1885 – 1932
- Labels: Victor, Paramount, Emerson, Brunswick
- Formerly of: Seventh Regiment Band

Walter Bowman Rogers (October 14, 1865 – December 24, 1939) was an American cornet player, concert band and orchestral conductor and composer, who was responsible for most of the orchestral arrangements on recordings made for the Victor Talking Machine Company between 1904 and 1916. He left the Victor Company when he accepted an equity partnership with the Paroquette recording company, a venture which ended when the company went into receivership. He accepted arranging, conducting positions with the Paramount and Emerson companies before he was offered an executive-level position by the Brunswick-Balke-Collander Company when the nationally known manufacturer of bowling, saloon, and phonograph cabinetry decided to expand its operations in the talking-machine industry by creating a line of phonograph recordings. Rogers became Brunswick's director of classical-music releases, a role he held until shortly before the Brunswick phonograph division was acquired by the Warner Brothers film corporation in April 1930.

== Biography ==
Rogers was born in Delphi, Indiana, and learned to play the violin and then the cornet as a child. He studied violin with Henry Schradieck at the Cincinnati Conservatory of Music, and paid for his study by playing in bands and orchestras in the Indianapolis area, where he also met his future Sousa Band colleague and lifelong friend Herbert L. Clarke when the two young men played in the orchestra of English's Opera House. In 1886, he moved to New York City to join the Seventh Regiment Band directed by Carlo Alberto Cappa. A report at the time described Rogers as "...a cornet soloist of great merit... [who] executes the most difficult passages with a degree of skill and a nicety of intonation that display a wonderful command of the instrument...". Rogers became Cappa's personal assistant and, after Cappa's death in 1893, took over leadership of the band. He first played in John Philip Sousa's band in 1898, and in 1900 became its assistant conductor. He shared cornet solo duties with Herbert L. Clarke and toured Europe with the Sousa band. When Clarke left in 1902, Rogers became the band's lead cornet player. Rogers also wrote pieces for the cornet; his best-known composition is "A Soldier's Dream", which he first recorded with Sousa's band for the Victor Talking Machine Company in 1900.

Rogers left Sousa in September 1903 to join the Victor Talking Machine Company as first cornet of the firm's studio ensembles, then directed by Arthur Pryor. Pryor formed his own concert band in late 1903, and he found the dual responsibilities of conducting his own group and overseeing ensemble recording at Victor too confining to advance his career as a popular bandmaster; thus, Pryor gave over the chief conductorship at Victor to Rogers in September 1904, while still continuing to make occasional recordings under the name "Pryor's Orchestra" and rapidly becoming Victor's leading concert band director with his own band. Rogers became the conductor of the regular Victor house orchestra, and engaged some extra players with whom he had played while under Cappa and Sousa. He arranged and conducted the studio orchestra for nearly all of Victor's recordings until 1916, for singers including Enrico Caruso, Billy Murray, and Al Jolson. Various combinations of musicians, under Rogers' direction, also recorded under different titles, including the Victor Light Opera Company, the Victor Orchestra, the Victor Concert Orchestra (which included extra players mostly taken from the Philadelphia Orchestra, a practice Victor would continue for decades), the Victor Mixed Chorus, and the Victor Military Band (many of whose recordings from 1912 on were conducted by Edward T. King, who was technically a Victor employee upon the company's acquisition of American Zonophone in 1906). Their most successful recordings included "The Merry Widow Waltz" (from The Merry Widow, performed by the Victor Orchestra, 1907), "The Glow-Worm" (from Paul Lincke's operetta Lysistrata, performed by the Victor Orchestra, 1908), and "The Yama Yama Man" (from The Three Twins, performed by Ada Jones and the Victor Light Opera Co., 1909). On one notable occasion in 1910, when American Quartet member Steve Porter was unavailable for a recording session, Rogers substituted for him in the vocal group. The resultant recording, of "Casey Jones", became "perhaps the first recording to sell over a million copies in American music history" although similar claims have been made for other recordings from the 1910s and 1920s including a Victor Red Seal disc by the concert soprano Alma Gluck and a Columbia popular-music recording by bandleader Ben Selvin. Such claims have been dismissed by subsequent recording-history researchers based upon original ledgers of the Victor, Columbia and other recording companies. Rogers also recorded many pieces of classical music, in many cases the first time these pieces had been recorded. Many of his recordings were made in competition with those of the Columbia Symphony Orchestra led by Charles A. Prince, and generally Rogers' recordings were more commercially successful than those of his rival.

Rogers left Victor for unknown reasons in the summer of 1916 to become musical director at Paroquette, a short-lived recording company set up by singer Henry Burr and banjoist Fred Van Eps. After its collapse, he worked for the Paramount Record Company, the Emerson Phonograph Company, and, from 1919, as General Music Directory of the Brunswick Phonograph Company, where he collaborated with Brunswick's popular-repertoire music director Gus Haenschen and conducted orchestral operatic accompaniments (for artists including Sigrid Onegin, Florence Easton, and Mario Chamlee) as he had done at Victor in addition to most of Brunswick's band records. He retired from recording in 1929. He played in a band in Huntsville, Ontario led by Herbert Clarke, and taught the cornet and played in theater orchestras in New York until 1932.

He died in New York in 1939, at the age of 74.
