= Love Me and the World Is Mine (song) =

American song published in 1906

Song
- Language: English
- Published: 1906
- Genre: Ballad
- Composer: Ernest R. Ball
- Lyricist: Dave Reed Jr.

Love Me and the World Is Mine is an American ballad published in 1906 with music by Ernest R. Ball, and lyrics by Dave Reed Jr. The original recordings from the 1900s by various singers are now in the public domain (United States) per the Music Modernization Act.

== History ==
This ballad was first introduced at Proctor's 5th Avenue (New York City) in 1906 during a Vaudeville performance. Featuring Ernest Ball's second wife Maude Lambert as the singer, the song was a huge success, and went on to sell a million record copies. M. Witmark & Sons took note of the song's popularity and decided to elevate Ball under a twenty-year contract as staff composer. It was further popularized from recordings by leading singers/groups of the time later that same year (1906). Canadian singer Henry Burr had a hit recording of the song, Albert Campbell's version topped the charts for 8 weeks, and Harry Anthony's for a week. The song was later revived by the Haydn Quartet in 1908. Love Me and the World Is Mine has since been used in several movie musicals which include San Francisco (1936), The Strawberry Blonde (1941), Irish Eyes Are Smiling (1944), and The Eddie Cantor Story (1953).. Variety magazine, in a fifty-year commemorative issue, selected Love Me and the World Is Mine for its "Hit Parade of a Half-Century (1905–1955)" list for 1906. The song has also "become a favorite" among the quartets of the Barbershop Harmony Society.

== Lyrics ==
I wander on as in a dream,
My goal a paradise must be,
For there an angel waits 'twould seem,
Yet lo' dear heart, 'tis only thee.
Suns may shine to light my way dear,
Wealth be mine for aye dear,
Queens may pledge their riches too;
Yet the world would still be lonely,
With such virtues only,
Life to me dear, means just you.

I care not for the stars that shine,
I dare not hope to e'er be thine,
I only know I love you,
Love me, and the world is mine.

[Chorus]
I care not for the stars that shine,
I dare not hope to e'er be thine,
I only know I love you,
Love me, and the world is mine.

Love Me and the World Is Mine uses common 4/4 verses while the "unusually short" chorus is set to 12/8 time. The lyrics used are described by author Don Tyler as "rather antiquated" and gives "'twould", "Yet lo' dear heart", "'tis only thee" and "be mine for aye" as examples of this in the song.

== Recordings ==
- Columbia #3499 - Henry Burr
- Victor #4823 - Albert Campbell
- Victor #5291 - Even Williams
- Victor #5416 - Harry Macdonough (solo)
- Victor #5437 - Haydn Quartet
- Edison #9371 - Harry Anthony
