= Roger Harding =

Roger Harding may refer to:

- Roger Harding (American football)
- Roger Harding (singer)
