= S. H. Dudley (singer) =

American opera singer (1864–1947)

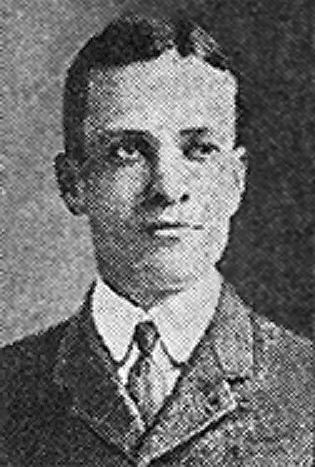
- Dudley, c. 1912

Background information
- Also known as: S. H. Dudley, Frank Kernell
- Born: Samuel Holland Rous; January 15, 1864; Greencastle, Indiana, U.S.
- Died: June 6, 1947 (aged 83) Los Angeles, California, U.S.
- Occupations: Singer; Music executive
- Instrument: Vocals
- Years active: 1880–1919
- Label: Victor
- Formerly of: The Haydn Quartet
- Spouse: Sofia Romani

Samuel Holland Rous (15 January 1864 – 6 June 1947), who recorded using the name S. H. Dudley, and less frequently as Frank Kernell, was an American singer, pioneer recording artist, and music business executive. He was unrelated to the black vaudeville performer and impresario Sherman Houston Dudley.

== Early life ==
Rous was born in Greencastle, Indiana, the son of a music teacher. After leaving school he found work as a baritone in touring light opera companies, and from the mid-1880s — with his wife, Sofia Romani, a soprano — toured the US, Mexico and South America as a member of the Emma Juch and Marie Tavary operatic ensembles. He continued to perform opera until 1896, when he began recording for the Berliner and Edison companies, both as a solo performer and as a member of vocal groups. On recordings, he used the pseudonym S. H. Dudley, perhaps deliberately using the name of the black vaudeville performer Sherman H. Dudley who was becoming popular at that time. Rous later claimed he was ignorant of the "real" S. H. Dudley's existence.

== Musical career ==
He principally recorded for Victor Records. As a solo singer using the name Dudley, he often recorded "coon songs" and other stereotypical minstrel show material. One of his biggest commercial successes was his recording of "When Reuben Comes To Town" in 1901. He recorded the song "Whistling", a skill for which he was noted and comic songs such as "Miss Helen Hunt", with the mildly risqué line "Go to Helen Hunt for it". He also recorded as a duo with Harry Macdonough.

=== Edison Male Quartet ===
He was an integral member of the Edison Male Quartet, which became the Haydn Quartet, along with Harry Macdonough, John Bieling, and William F. Hooley. The group was one of the most popular of the period, and had many successes including "In the Good Old Summer Time" (1903), "Bedelia" (1904), "Sweet Adeline (You're the Flower of My Heart)" (1904), "How'd You Like To Spoon With Me" (with Corinne Morgan, 1906), "Take Me Out to the Ball Game" (with Billy Murray, 1908), "Sunbonnet Sue" (1908), "Put On Your Old Gray Bonnet" (1909), and "By the Light of the Silv'ry Moon" (with Murray, 1910). On some of the group's later recordings, he was replaced by Reinald Werrenrath.

=== Victor Records ===
In 1902, Sam Rous, using his real name, was appointed as assistant manager of Victor Records' artists and repertoire division. He gave the company's star singer Billy Murray the sobriquet "The Denver Nightingale". Rous continued to record for several years, both as Dudley and using the pseudonym Frank Kernell, but at a much-reduced level. He was also the first editor of Victor's record catalog, the Victor Book of the Opera (or Victrola Book of the Opera), first published in 1912. This contained illustrated details of the plots and production histories of operas, and cataloged available Victor recordings of them. The book went through many editions and remained in print until 1976.

== Later life and death ==
He retired in 1919, and with his wife went to live in France. They returned to the U.S. shortly before World War II and lived in California. Rous died in Los Angeles in 1947, at the age of 83; his wife, who had been paralyzed for several years, died the next day.
