= Edward T. King =

Edward T. "Eddie" King was an early twentieth century percussionist, conductor, Artist and Repertoire (A&R) man, and manager for Zon-o-phone, the Victor Talking Machine Company, and Columbia Records.

== Career ==
=== Zon-o-phone ===
According to Gracyk, after having been with Columbia, King joined Zon-o-phone in 1905 and, in 1907, became musical director of performances. He was also a Zon-o-phone A&R manager.

=== Victor ===
Gracyk says that King "began to work regularly in Victor's New York studio after Victor stopped the operation of its Zon-o-phone subsidiary in 1912."

As early as 1911, Victor used the name "King's Orchestra" for one of its house orchestras. From ca 1915 to ca 1920 King was manager of Victor's Foreign Department, the unit responsible for making the recordings for the foreign and ethnic groups in the United States, excluding recordings made by the Race, Hillbilly, and Export (to Central and South America) Departments. King's Orchestra was the primary house orchestra for making foreign recordings during this period. For the majority of the orchestra's foreign department recordings, King's Orchestra served as the accompanying orchestra for Victor's foreign vocal and instrumental artists.

About mid-1915, King hired Nathaniel Shilkret to work for him as conductor and arranger at Victor, and Shilkret replaced King as manager of the Foreign Department when King was promoted to Director of Light Music.

King was also a member of Victor's A&R committee. In his autobiography, Shilkret lists the Victor Talking Machine A&R committee as consisting of Harry MacDonough (chairman), Eddie King, Shilkret, R. P. Wielage, Porter, and Davis. Shilkret cites King as the A&R man responsible for bringing Kate Smith to Victor.

As Director of Light Music King was well known as an authoritarian who would not any permit departure from the written music. This was a source of irritation to many of the popular Victor recording artists of the time. Sudhalter cites an example of a 1927 recording by the Goldkette Orchestra in which musicians were allowed considerable freedom, and remarks "What, one wonders, would this performance have been if Eddie King had been in charge, and not the more liberal Nat Shilkret." Since the Victor ledgers show no less than five recording sessions in January and February 1926, when King actually conducted Goldkette’s Orchestra, comparison between the approach of Goldkette and King is readily available.

King also conducted many other dance orchestras, such as those of Paul Whiteman, Ted Weems and Irving Aaronson. King went to cities such as Chicago, Oakland, and New Orleans when Victor began recording in these cities.

=== Columbia ===
King left Victor in October 1926 to go back to Columbia, and again his replacement, this time as Victor's Director of Light Music, was Shilkret.

== Legacy ==
King was one of a group of five that constituted, by a large margin, Victor's most prolific recording artists. EDVR shows over 2000 entries for King. (The other most prolific Victor Talking Machine recording musicians were Nathaniel Shilkret and Rosario Bourdon, each of whom have well over 3000 entries in EDVR, and Walter B. Rogers and Josef Pasternack, each with around 2000 entries in EDVR.)
