= U.S. Everlasting Records =

American record label

U.S. Everlasting Records was an American record label which was in operation from 1908 to 1912. It issued two-minute and four-minute phonographic cylinders made of celluloid, and released over 1000 titles.

The label Lakeside was used when the records were sold by Montgomery Ward department stores.

Artists on the label included popular singers such as Ada Jones, Arthur Collins, Will Oakland, Frank C. Stanley, Walter Van Brunt, and Henry Burr, and the popular vocal group Peerless Quartet. The label also issued both popular and classical instrumental music.
