= Billy Golden =

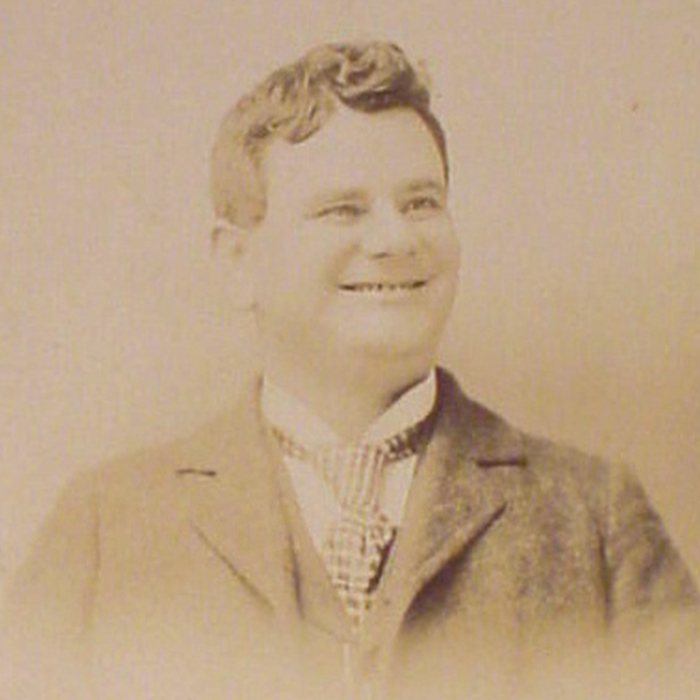
- Golden in 1895
- Born: William Benjamin Shires; June 9, 1858; Cincinnati, Ohio, U.S.
- Died: January 29, 1926 (aged 67); New York City, U.S.
- Other names: Billie Golden, Billy G.
- Occupations: Comedian; Singer; Actor; Vaudevillian
- Years active: 1874-1926
- Known for: Blackface comedy and sound recording
- Notable work: Turkey in the Straw (1891), Roll on de Ground (1899), and Uncle Jefferson (1891-1901)

William Benjamin Shires (June 9, 1858 – January 29, 1926), who performed and recorded as Billy Golden, was an American blackface comic, actor, and singer who was a popular recording artist between the 1890s and the 1910s.

== Biography ==
He was born on June 9, 1858 in Cincinnati, Ohio, to John Shires and Elizabeth Rust. He was raised in St Louis, Missouri. He began performing as a blackface act in vaudeville in 1874 before working as a duo with, first, John Merritt, and then Billy Draiton. He originated a dance move known as the "cane pat" which became popular with blackface minstrels, and, as part of Bailess and Kennedy's "Brightlights" vaudeville act, became particularly associated with the song "Turkey in the Straw". In 1885, he started performing in a duo with his wife, May Golden.

In 1891, he recorded "Turkey in the Straw" for Columbia Records; it became one of the best-selling recordings of the year. He re-recorded the piece many times for Berliner (as well as their successor company Victor), Zonophone, Edison and many others . Other successful recordings by Golden included "Uncle Jefferson" (1891), "Rabbit Hash" (1895), "Bye Bye, Ma Honey" (1895), "Yaller Gal" (1899), and "Roll On The Ground" (1901). Most of his early recordings were as a solo performer besides some recordings under the "Spencer Trio" in which he recorded alongside Len Spencer and Steve Porter. In 1907 he formed a new duo act with Joe Hughes, and they recorded together for several labels. Golden and Hughes were among the first two-man teams to record blackface minstrel humor in black dialect. The two would also have success and popularity in vaudeville as well.

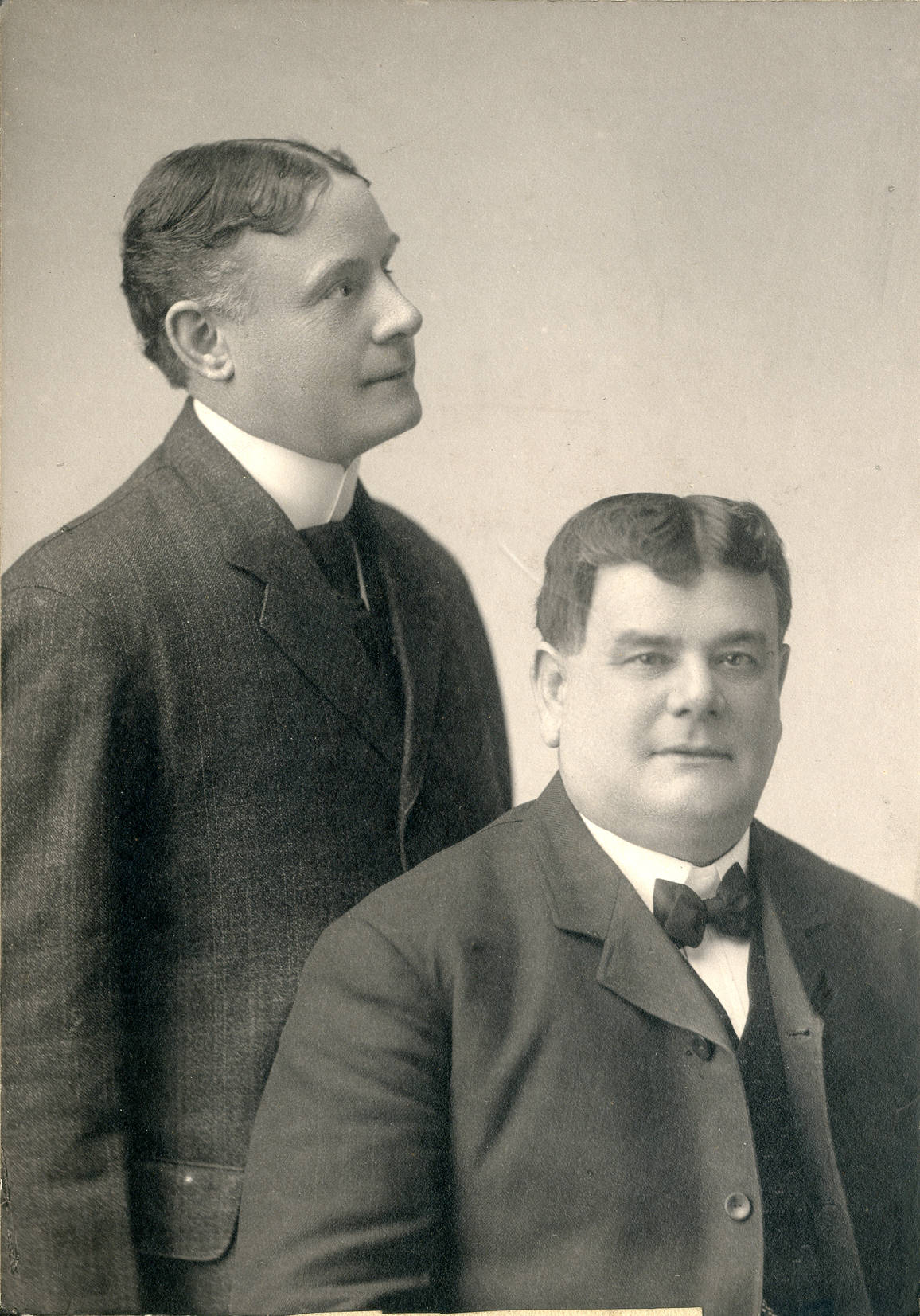
Golden along with his vaudeville and minstrel partner, Joe Hughes, August 1909.

After Hughes retired from performing, Golden began working with James Marlowe and then, after Marlowe's death in 1917, with Billy Heins. In 1919, he reunited with Hughes for several more recordings. Afterwards, Golden continued to record and perform as a solo act.

He died in New York City on January 29, 1926, of myocarditis at age 67. He was buried in Kensico Cemetery in Valhalla, New York.
