= Steve Porter (singer) =

American pioneer recording artist and singer

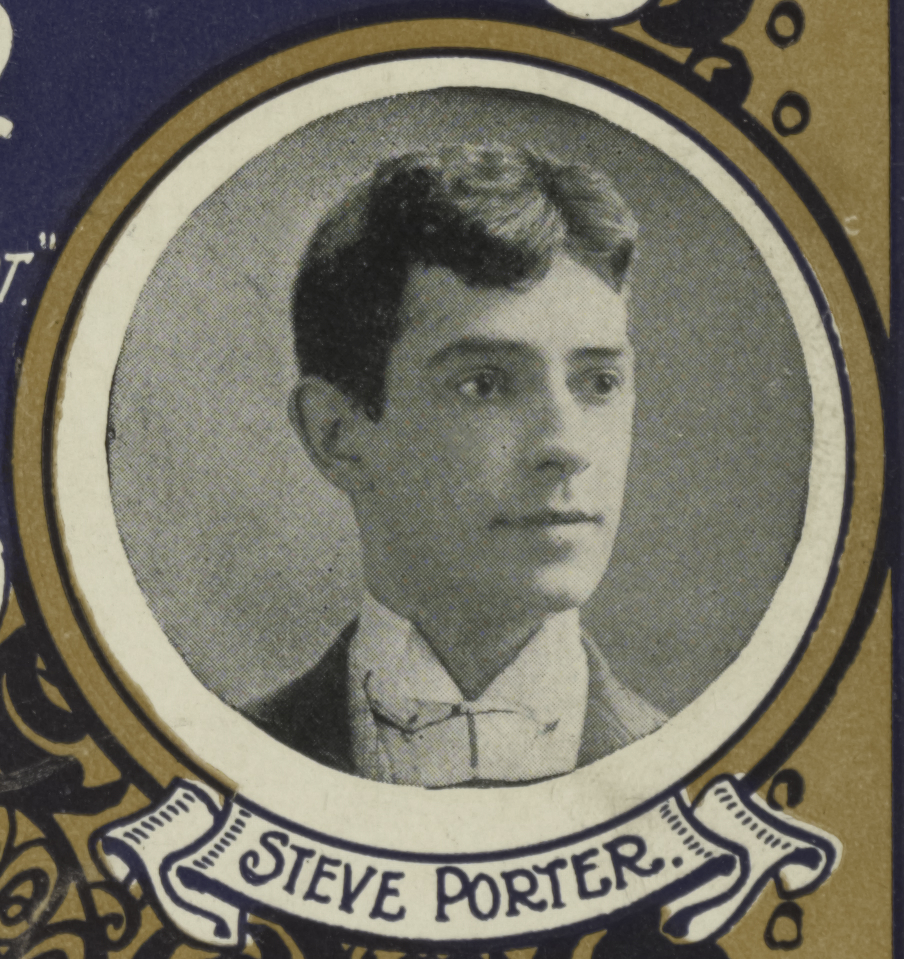
- Porter in 1898

Background information
- Born: Stephen Carl Porter; May 1863; Buffalo, New York, U.S.
- Died: January 13, 1936 (aged 72) New York City, New York, U.S.
- Genres: Ballad; Ragtime; Folk; Jazz
- Occupations: Singer, entrepreneur
- Years active: 1896–1928
- Formerly of: Peerless Quartet; American Quartet
- Spouse: Emma Frances Fachon (m. 1890)

Stephen Carl Porter (May 1863 – January 13, 1936) was an American pioneer recording artist, who recorded prolifically for numerous recording companies in the 1890s and early 1900s. He was also an entrepreneur who helped establish the recording industry in India in the early years of the twentieth century, and successfully marketed a new form of hearing aid.

== Biography ==
Steve Porter was born in Buffalo in May 1863. In the 1890s he performed as a baritone singer in vaudeville, as a member of the Diamond Comedy Four with Albert Campbell, Jim Reynard, and Billy Jones, who worked as song pluggers in "Tin Pan Alley" for the music publishers Joe Stern and Edward B. Marks. Porter first recorded with the Diamond Comedy Four and Diamond Quartet for Stern and Marks' Universal Phonograph Company in early 1897. In later 1897 he began recording for Berliner Gramophone with the Diamond Comedy Four and Diamond Four, and solo, and for the Columbia Phonograph Company with the Greater New York Quartet (with Harding, Spencer and Depew) and solo. His solo recordings of "On the Banks of the Wabash", "She Was More to Be Pitied Than Censured" (1898), "A Picture No Artist Can Paint" (1899), "A Bird in a Gilded Cage" (1900), and "The Little Brown Jug" (1900) sold well.

In 1901, after a failed attempt to set-up a motion picture company with fellow recording artist Russell Hunting, Porter established the American Phonograph Record Company of Brooklyn, with William F. Hooley and Samuel H. Rous of The Haydn Quartet as co-directors. However, this also failed, and in 1902 Porter sailed to London, where he recorded for Waterfield, Clifford & Company before joining the Nicole Record Company. He worked there both as a recording engineer and as a performer, recording comic tunes, ballads and old standards, before sailing to India with John Watson Hawd to set up a recording business for Nicole Frères in Calcutta. Porter then traveled around India and Burma, finding musicians to be recorded in Nicole's Calcutta studio. He finally returned to the US in 1905.

After his return, he recorded as one member of the Columbia Male Quartet, known after 1906 as the Peerless Quartet, who originally also included tenors Henry Burr and Albert Campbell, and bass Tom Daniels. Porter remained with the quartet until 1909. However, Porter increasingly performed as a comedic artist, becoming popular for his Irish characterizations and skits. He recorded many of these for Edison and Columbia after 1906, an example being "Pat O'Brien's Automobile" (1908).

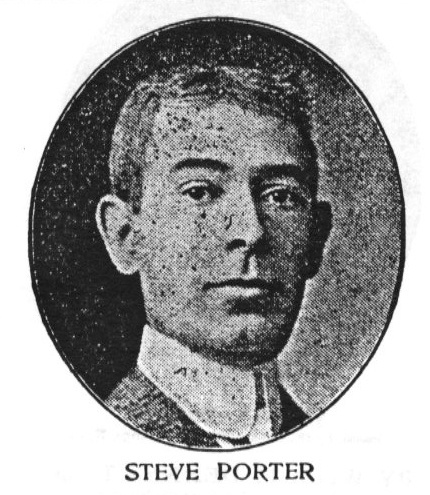
Porter in the 1910s

After 1909, Porter recorded mainly as a member of the American Quartet, with Billy Murray, John Bieling, and William F. Hooley. Their most successful recordings included "Oh, You Beautiful Doll" (1911), "Moonlight Bay" (1912), "It's a Long, Long Way to Tipperary" (1914), and "Over There" (1917). Porter also continued his entrepreneurial activities, filing a patent for a new form of record in 1911, and in 1916 established a business, the Port-O-Phone Corporation, to market a new type of acoustic hearing aid. Unlike his previous enterprises, this was a relatively profitable undertaking, and the hearing aids were successfully marketed around the world.

Porter left the American Quartet in 1919, although his recording career continued into the 1920s. The Port-O-Phone Corporation suffered a near-collapse in the Wall Street crash of 1929, and was wound up a few years later as its models were superseded by new technology.

Porter died of a heart attack on January 13, 1936, in Brooklyn. He was 72.
