= Len Spencer =

American recording artist (1867–1914)

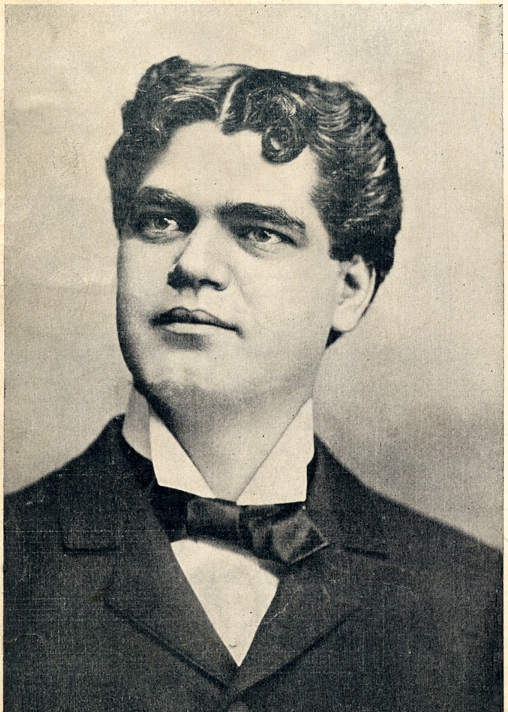
- Spencer in 1899
- Born: Leonard Garfield Spencer; February 12, 1867; Washington, DC, U.S.
- Died: December 15, 1914 (aged 47); New York City, U.S.
- Resting place: Glenwood Cemetery, Washington, DC
- Other name: Gerry Allen
- Occupations: Recording artist, composer, author, booking agent
- Spouse(s): Margaret (Allen) Spencer (married 1885, died 1891); Elizabeth (Norris) Spencer (married 1892, died 1941)
- Children: 5, one died at birth, another in infancy Advertising Record This 1906 record by Spencer enticed store customers with the wonders of the phonograph.

Signature
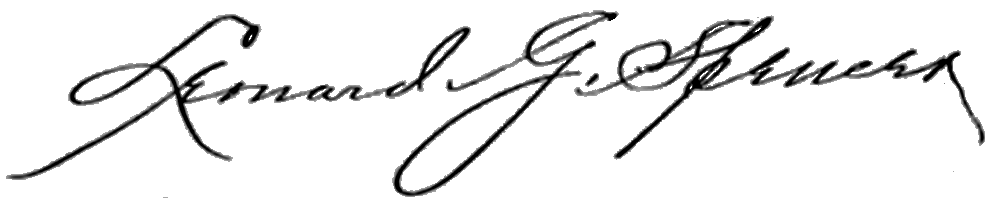

Leonard Garfield Spencer (February 12, 1867 – December 15, 1914) was an American singer, composer, booking agent and vaudeville star who was considered one of the most popular recording artists in the United States from the 1890s to the 1910s.

== Biography ==
Leonard Garfield Spencer was born on February 12, 1867 in Washington D.C. to Henry Caleb Spencer Sr. and Sarah Jane Andrews. He had two younger siblings, Platt Rasson Spencer, who died in infancy, and Henry "Harry" Caleb Spencer Jr., who was also an early recording artist. Before entering the phonograph industry, he worked as an instructor for the Spencerian Business College in Washington. He began recording for the Columbia Phonograph Company, in 1889 or 1890.

Between 1892 and 1897 he recorded extensively for the New Jersey Phonograph Company and its successor the United States Phonograph Company. He specialized in vaudeville sketches and comic songs, but also sang sentimental ballads popular at the time. He returned to Columbia in 1898 for an exclusive contract then began recording for Berliner Gramophone (disc) records in 1899 and continued with Victor and Columbia as discs became the dominant format in the early 1900s.

He began performing with banjoist Vess L. Ossman in 1901 and with Ada Jones in 1905. He is notable for his vaudeville-style comic sketches, such as "The Arkansaw Traveler" (1902), combining clever turns of phrase, ironic elocutionary delivery, sound effects and music to create colorful dialogues featuring itinerant Southerners, auctioneers, circus barkers, and Irish, Jewish or Black Americans. He also performed in the “Spencer Trio” from 1902 to 1904 with Billy Golden and Steve Porter.

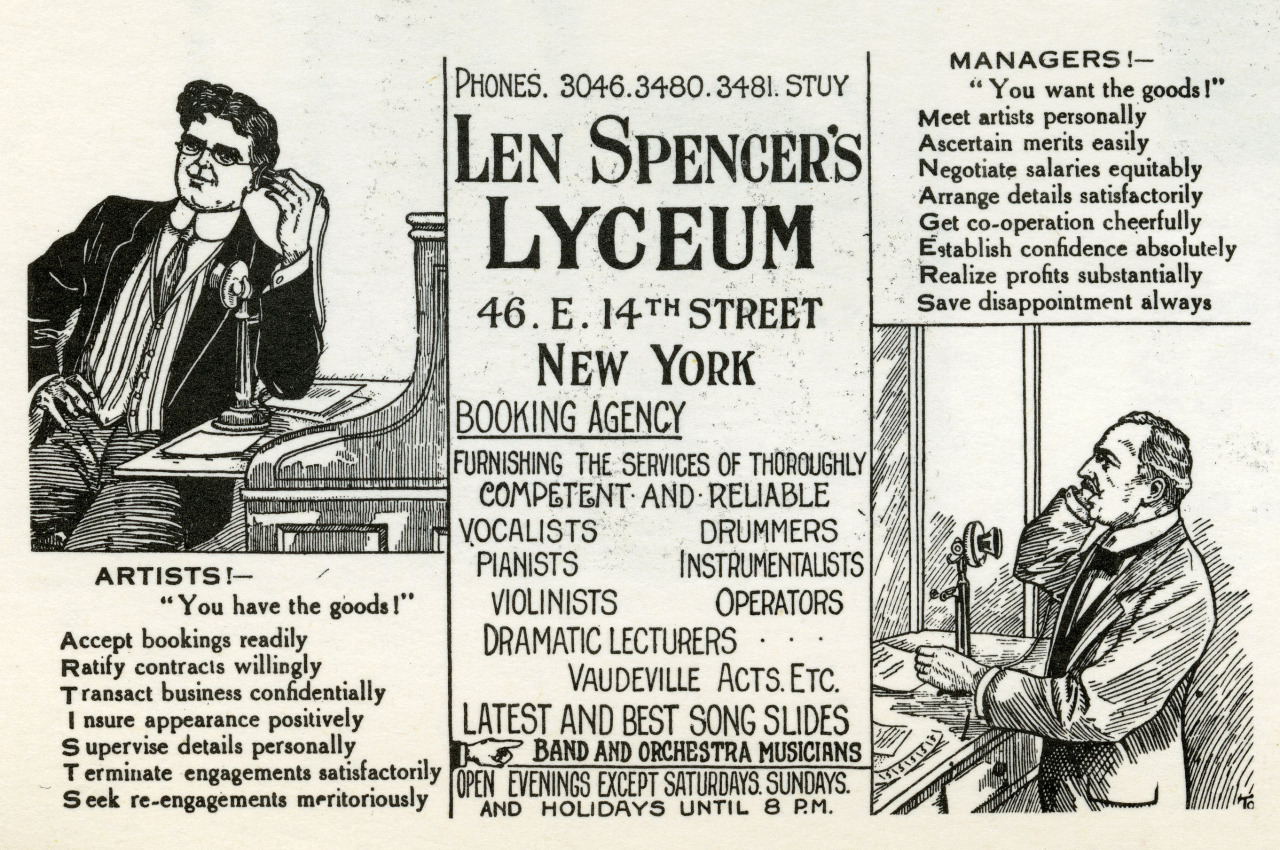
Advertisement for Len Spencer's Lyceum, ca. 1912.

Many of his roles were performed in either blackface or brownface. Spencer's output was eclectic. He imitated animal sounds in "A Barnyard Serenade" (1906) and released another record titled "The Transformation Scene from 'Dr. Jekyll and Mr. Hyde'," but also popularized songs still known today such as "Ta-Ra-Ra-Boom De-ay" and "A Hot Time in the Old Town." Music historian Bob Stanley deems it "probable" that Spencer's comedic "Arkansaw Traveler" routine was the first record to sell one million copies, though official documentation is lacking. In 1904, he recorded a speech attributed to Eugene V. Debs, entitled "The Socialist movement."

Spencer was married twice. He married Margaret Allen on April 8, 1885 and remained married to her until her death in 1891. They had two daughters, one who was stillborn. He married Elizabeth Norris on July 20, 1892, with whom he had three more daughters.

As the popularity of Len's style of humor waned in the latter part of the decade, he opened a booking agency called "Len Spencer's Lyceum" in New York. He died of a heart attack while working at the Lyceum on December 15, 1914, at age 47. His funeral was held at the Frank E. Campbell Funeral Chapel and his remains were cremated and buried in Glenwood Cemetery in Washington D.C. Recordings of Spencer himself reciting the Lord's Prayer and Psalm 23 were played during the service.

== Discography ==
Some of his most popular recordings include:

- "Ta-Ra-Ra-Boom De-ay" (1892)
- "The Old Folks at Home" (1892)
- "Little Alabama Coon" (1895)
- "Dat New Bully" (1895)
- "A Hot Time in the Old Town" (1897)
- "Hello! Ma Baby" (1899)
- "Ma Tiger Lily" (1900)
- "Arkansaw Traveler" (1902)
- "Peaches and Cream", (1906) with Ada Jones (John B. Lowitz wax cylinder)

== See also ==
- Ada Jones
