= Over There =

1917 song by George M. Cohan

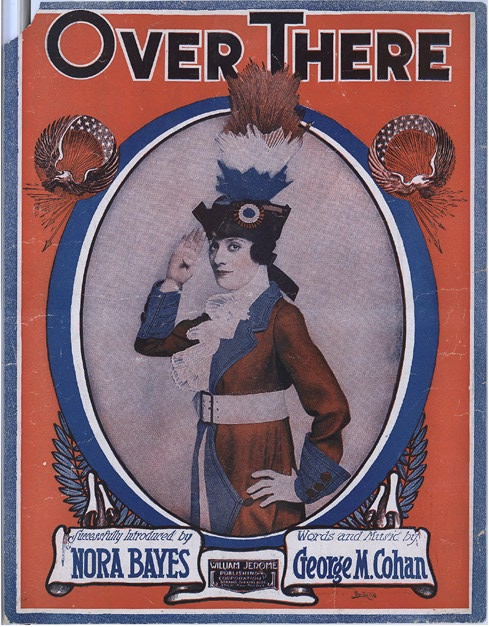
- 1917 sheet music cover with Nora Bayes

Song
- Written: April 7, 1917
- Published: June 1917
- Released: July 13, 1917
- Genre: War song; American march; Tin Pan Alley
- Songwriter: George M. Cohan

Audio sample
- "Over There" sung in 1917 by Billy Murray: file; help

"Over There" is a 1917 war song written by George M. Cohan that was popular with the United States military and the American public during World War I and World War II. Written shortly after the American entry into World War I, "Over There" is a patriotic motivational song meant to galvanize American men to enlist in the American Expeditionary Forces and fight the Central Powers. The song is best remembered for a line in its chorus: "The Yanks are coming."

== History ==
According to the Library of Congress, Cohan wrote "Over There" during his commute to work on April 7, 1917, a day after the U.S. officially abandoned its policy of non-interventionism and joined the Allied Powers. Its opening verse is derived from "Johnny, Get Your Gun", an 1886 song written by Monroe Rosenfeld, while its rhythm was based on a three-note bugle call.

Cohan personally chose Nora Bayes to premiere "Over There" in June 1917, but the Peerless Quartet recorded it first on June 6 with Columbia Records. Bayes's rendition was released on July 13. Though early tests with soldiers saw indifferent reception, the song was popular among the civilian public. Other versions recorded by Billy Murray, the American Quartet, and Arthur Fields were also made. President Woodrow Wilson described it as "a genuine inspiration to all American manhood". By the end of 1918, over 2 million copies of sheet music were sold.

Though written and intended for World War I, the song has been revived on various occasions during and after World War II. It was not heavily used during the Vietnam War, but it regained some popularity in the 21st century after the September 11 attacks and throughout the war on terror. In June 2026, CBS News included the song in its list of the 250 essential American songs of the past 250 years.

== Lyrics ==
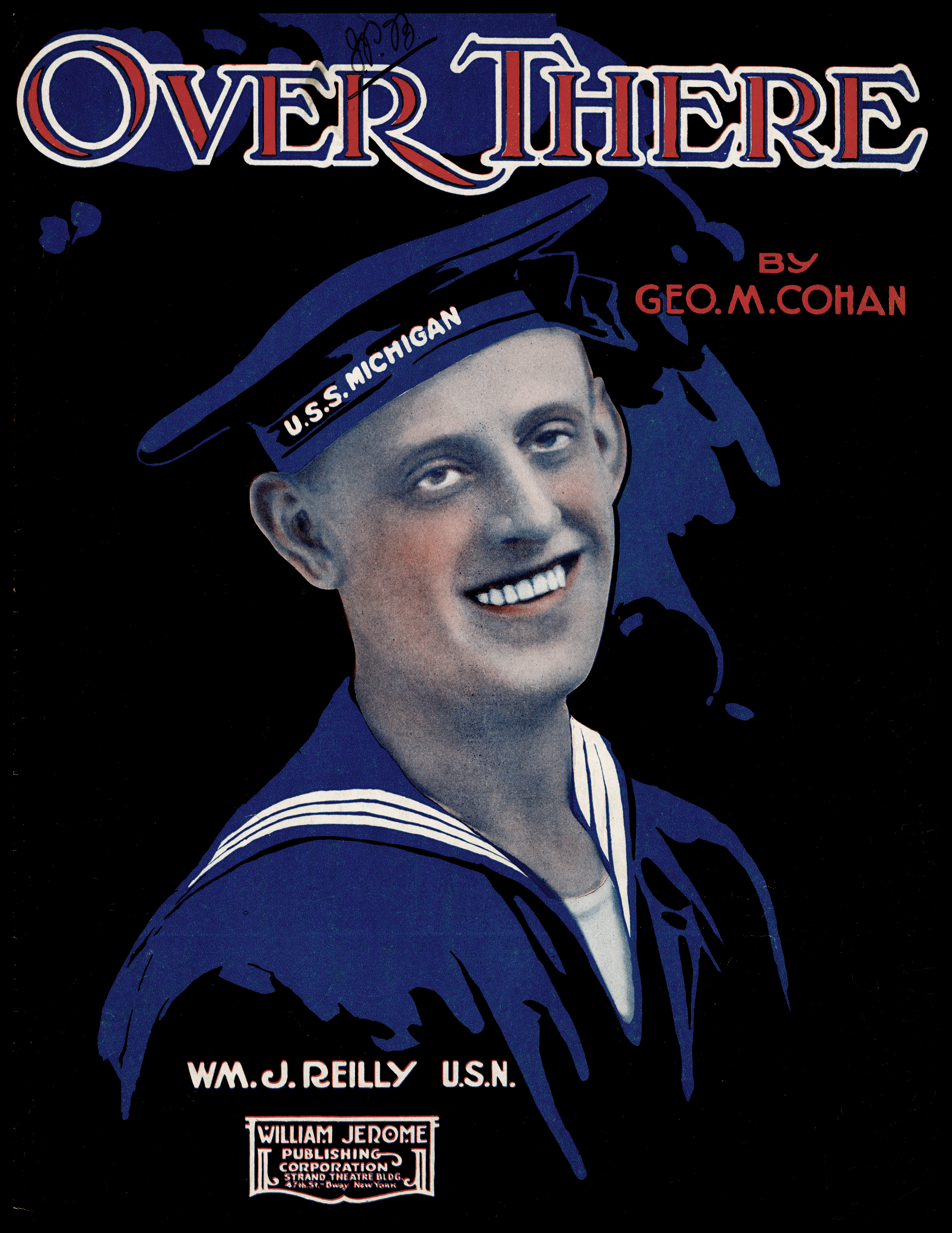
Sheet music from 1917 featuring sailor William J. Reilly of the USS Michigan

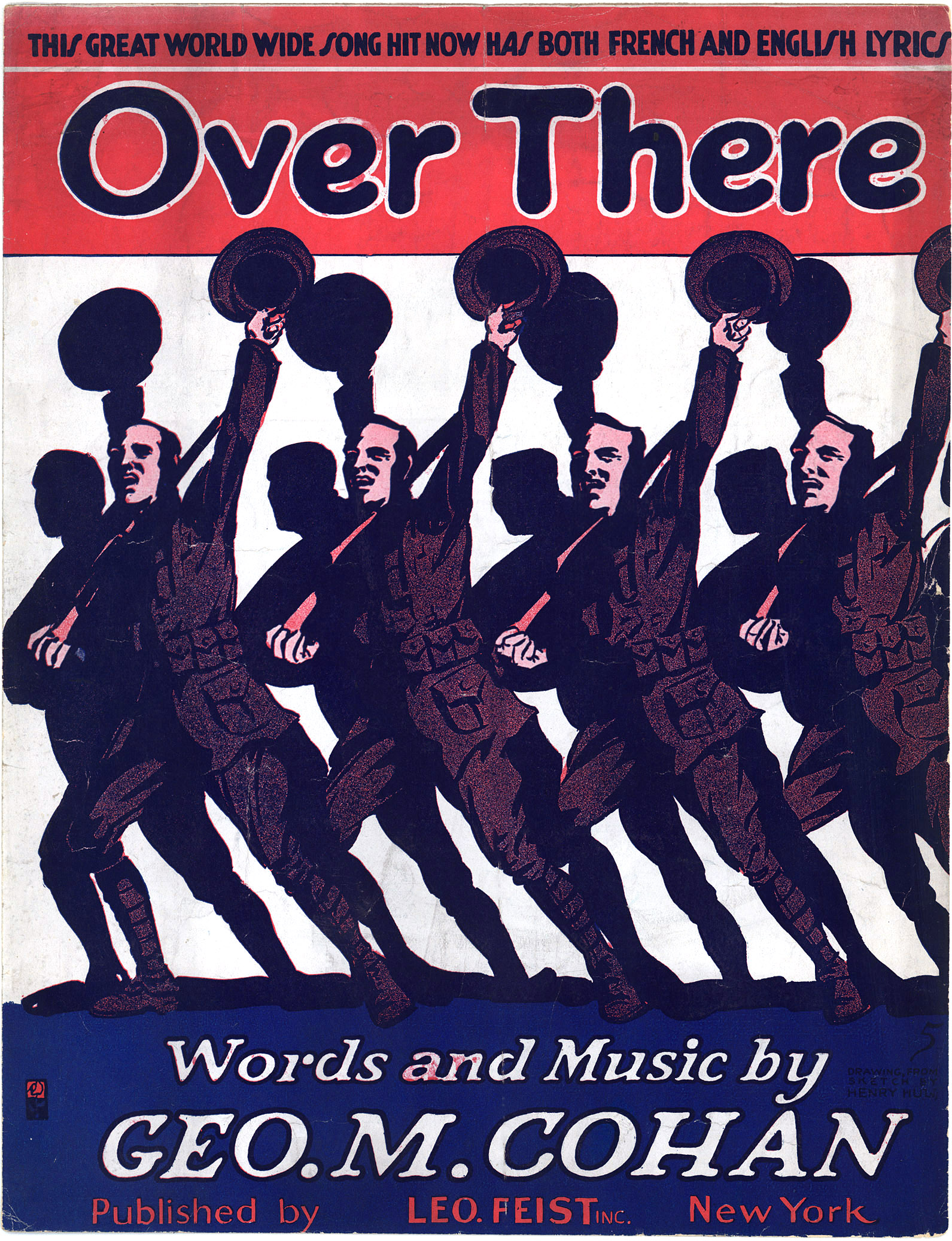
Cover drawing of soldiers from sketch by Henry Hutt

As sung by early 20th-century recording artist Billy Murray:

Verse 1

Johnny, (Note: "Johnny" is a very common English given name and is used to address any anonymous man or men.) get your gun, get your gun, get your gun.
Take it on the run, on the run, on the run.
Hear them calling you and me,
Every Son of Liberty.
Hurry right away, no delay, go today.
Make your daddy glad to have had such a lad.
Tell your sweetheart not to pine,
To be proud her boy's in line.

Verse 2

Johnny, get your gun, get your gun, get your gun.
Johnny, show the Hun you're a son of a gun.
Hoist the flag and let her fly;
Yankee Doodle, (Note: Also sung as "Like true heroes...") do or die.
Pack your little kit, show your grit, do your bit.
Yankee (Note: Also sung as "Soldiers...") to the ranks from the towns and the tanks. (Note: Short for "tank town", meaning any town so small its primary purpose was to provide water for steam locomotives.)
Make your mother proud of you
And the old red, white, and blue. (Note: Also sung as "And to liberty be true.")

Chorus

Over there, over there,
Send the word, send the word over there
That the Yanks are coming, the Yanks are coming,
The drums rum-tumming everywhere.
So prepare, say a prayer,
Send the word, send the word to beware –
We'll be over, we're coming over,
And we won't come back till it's over, over there.

== In popular culture ==
- Since 2009, UK financial services comparison website Go.Compare has used an adapted version of the song for their adverts, sung by Wynne Evans.
- The song provides the introduction to the Kanonenfieber song "The Yankee Division March" (with Trevor Strnad).
- In the video game Hell Let Loose, set in World War II, the song plays when the United States win a match.

== See also ==
- List of best-selling sheet music
