= Hayden Quartet =

Early 20th century popular vocal quartet

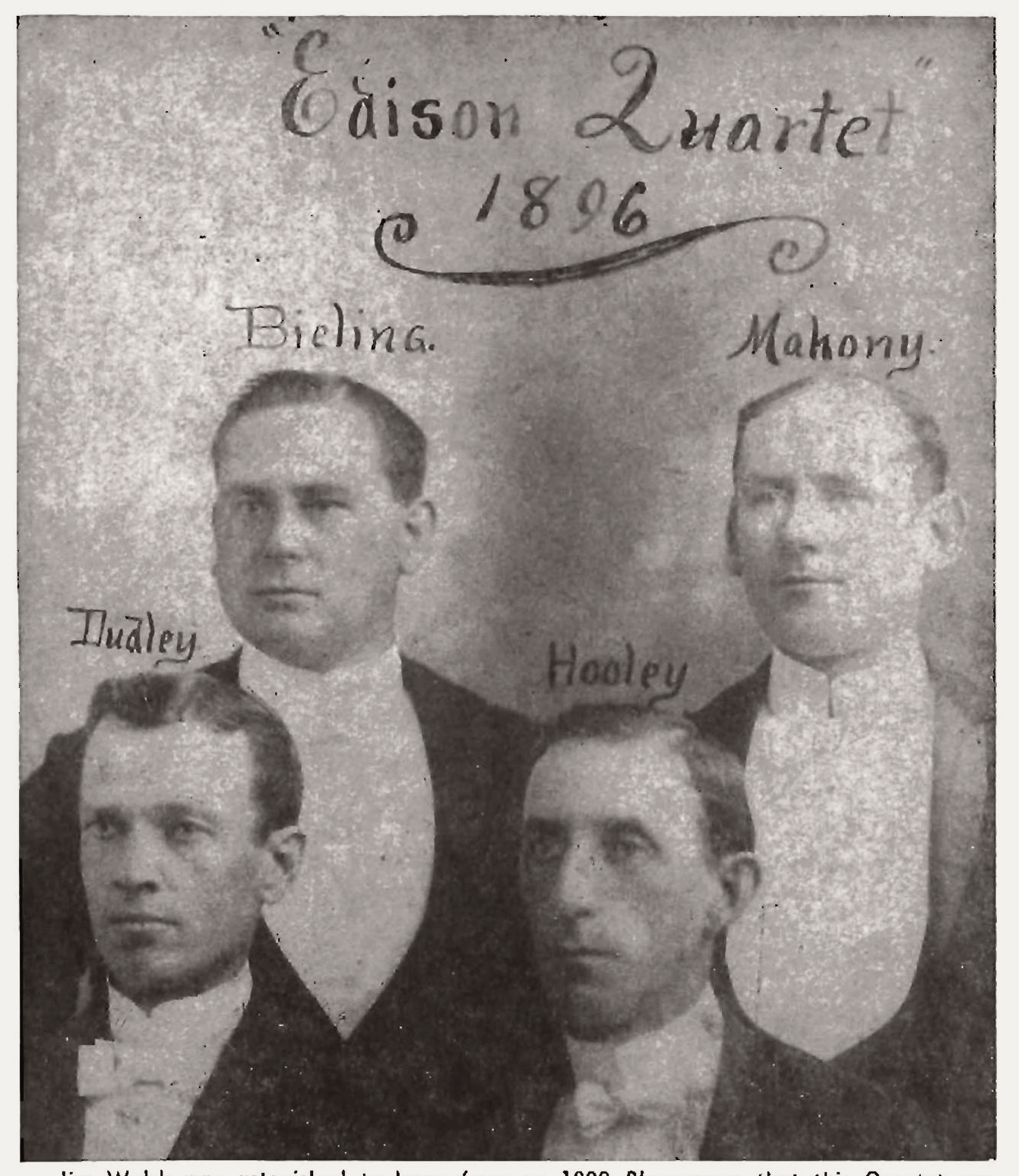
- Founding members of the Edison Quartet, 1896

Background information
- Also known as: The Edison Quartet; Haydn Quartet
- Genres: Vocal group
- Years active: 1896–1914
- Labels: Victor, Edison
- Past members: John Bieling (tenor); Jere Mahoney (tenor: 1896–1899); S. H. Dudley (baritone); William F. Hooley (bass: 1896–1914); Harry Macdonough (tenor: 1899–1914); Billy Murray (tenor: 1908–1910)

The Hayden Quartet, formerly known as the Haydn Quartet was one of the most popular recording close harmony quartets in the early twentieth century. It was originally formed in 1896 as the Edison Quartet to record for Edison Records; it took its new name when recording for other companies. The name was a homage to Joseph Haydn, the classical composer; the spelling was later revised to Hayden, which reflects the way it was pronounced. The group disbanded in 1914.

== Formation ==
The Haydn Quartet originally formed under the name "Edison Quartet" in 1896, with a membership of John Bieling (tenor), Jere Mahoney (tenor), Samuel Holland Rous (who performed under the name S. H. Dudley, baritone), and William F. Hooley (bass). Mahoney was soon replaced by John Scantlebury Macdonald, who used the pseudonym Harry Macdonough. They recorded as the Edison Quartet (or Edison Male Quartet), before taking the name Haydn Quartet around 1898 in order to record for companies other than Edison.

In 1901 they signed a contract with the Victor Talking Machine Company, and in 1902 also traveled to the UK to record for the Gramophone Company, which was Victor's affiliate. The group had great success over the next decade as one of the premier recording groups of the time, on a par with the Peerless Quartet. The Haydn Quartet often sang material at a slower tempo and in a statelier fashion than other groups. The ensemble also performed vaudeville and minstrel show songs, one of which, "The Camp Meeting Jubilee", released in 1904 as Victor no. 4003, includes a very early recorded use of the phrase "rockin' and rollin'", albeit used with a spiritual rather than secular connotation.

Recordings credited to the Haydn Quartet began to be phased out in 1908. After that time, Billy Murray frequently sang lead with the group, and S. H. Dudley was often replaced by Reinald Werrenrath. Following the successful collaborations between Murray and the Haydn Quartet, Victor organized a new group, the American Quartet, in 1910, with Murray, Bieling and Hooley from the Haydn Quartet, and baritone Steve Porter. The group's name was spelled Hayden after 1910. The quartet disbanded in 1914. As well as members participating in the American Quartet, Macdonough and Hooley, together with Reinald Werranrath and tenor Lambert Murphy, also formed the Orpheus Quartet, who recorded successfully until 1919.

In his book Pop Memories 1890-1954, music archivist and statistician Joel Whitburn assessed a variety of sources such as Talking Machine World's lists of top-selling recordings, and Billboard's sheet music and vaudeville charts, to estimate the most successful recordings of the period. He concluded that the Haydn Quartet had 62 "top ten" hits in all between 1898 and 1914, and in the decade 1900-1909 had more successful recordings than any other group, behind only Macdonough and Murray, who recorded as solo artists in addition to their group performances. Although Whitburn's methods of assessment have been criticized, this confirms that the group were one of the most popular of their era.

== Discography ==
=== Hit singles ===
Title	Year	
Title	Year	Peak position
She Was Bred In Old Kentucky	1898	3
Cornfield Medley	1899	4
Because	1900	1
In the Good Old Summer Time	1903	1
In the Sweet Bye and Bye	1903	3
My Old Kentucky Home	1903	2
Bedelia	1904	1
Blue Bell	1904	1
Dear Old Girl	1904	2
I Am Longing For You, Sweetheart, Day By Day	1904	4
Old Folks at Home	1904	4
Sweet Adeline (You're the Flower of My Heart)	1904	1
Toyland	1904	1
Come Along, Little Girl, Come Along	1905	8
Dearie	1905	1
Down Where The Silv'ry Mohawk Flows	1905	4
Grandfather's Clock	1905	5
In the Shade of the Old Apple Tree	1905	2
My Little Canoe	1905	2
Silent Night Hallowed Night	1905	2
Tell Me With Your Eyes	1905	3
The Holy City	1905	10
Where The Southern Roses Grow	1905	6
How'd You Like To Spoon With Me? (Note: with Corinne Morgan)	1906	1
In Dear Old Georgia	1906	3
Just A Little Rocking Chair And You	1906	4
Waltz Me Around Again, Willie	1906	5
When the Roll Is Called Up Yonder	1906	6
Will You Love Me In December As You Do In May?	1906	2
In the Wildwood Where The Blue Bells Grew	1907	2
My Wild Irish Rose (Note: This song could possibly be from 1905)	1907	2
Stein Song	1907	10
When The Flowers Bloom In The Springtime, Molly Dear	1907	5
Here's To The Girl!	1908	5
I'm Happy When The Band Plays Dixie	1908	8
Keep On Smiling	1908	2
Love Me and the World Is Mine	1908	7
Rainbow	1908	7
Sunbonnet Sue	1908	1
Take Me Out to the Ball Game (Note: with Billy Murray)	1908	1
When It's Moonlight on the Prairie	1908	5
Yankee Doodle's Come To Town	1908	8
Brown Eyes, Good-Bye	1909	3
Lonesome	1909	3
Meet Me In The Rose-Time, Rosie	1909	6
Put On Your Old Gray Bonnet	1909	1
Sullivan	1909	5
Take Me Up With You, Dearie	1909	4
Take Me Out For A Joy Ride	1909	4
The Hat My Father Wore On St. Patrick's Day	1909	3
Up, Up, Up In My Aeroplane	1909	3
By the Light of the Silvery Moon	1910	1
Down In Sunshine Alley	1910	4
I'll Make A Ring Around Rosie	1910	2
Meet Me Where the Lanterns Glow	1910	5
My Heart Has Learned To Love You, Now Do Not Say Good-bye	1910	7
Tell Mother I'll Be There	1910	6
The Garden Of Roses	1910	9
Mary	1911	7
By The Saskatchewan	1911	5
In The Evening By The Moonlight	1913	2
Cross the Great Divide (Note: This was the group's last hit song.)	1914	4

=== Popular songs ===
- Annie Laurie (1901)
- Carry me back to ole Virginie (1901)
- My Bonnie Lies Over The Ocean (1901)
- Way Down Yonder in the Cornfield (1903)
- Glory Song (1905)
- The Jolly Blacksmiths (1906)
