= Will Oakland =

American singer

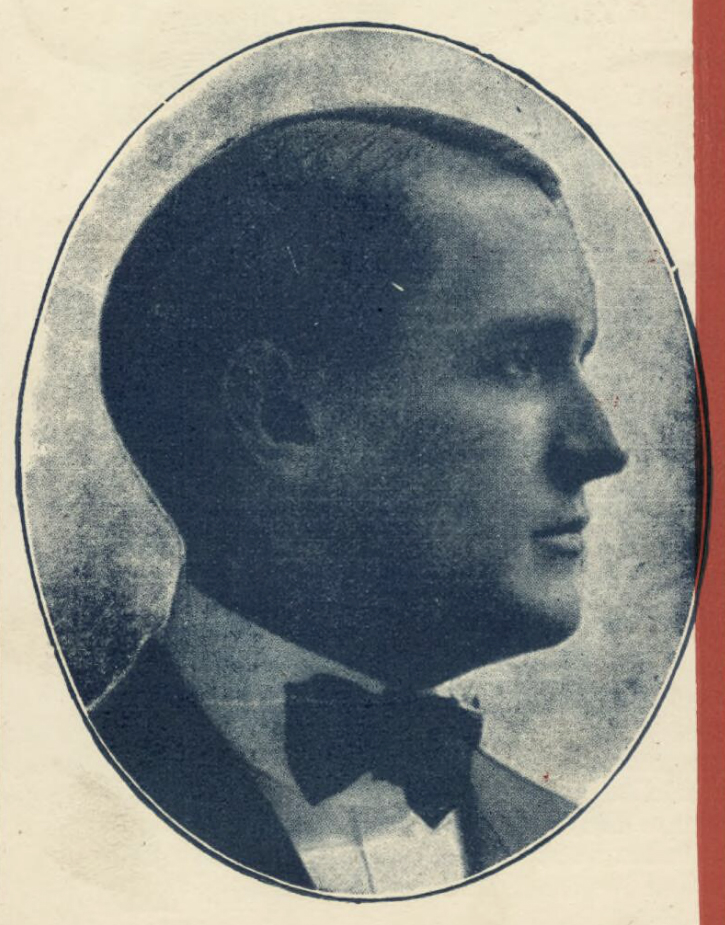
- Portrait of Oakland ca. 1915
- Born: Herman Hinrichs; January 15, 1880; Jersey City, New Jersey, U.S.
- Died: May 15, 1956 (aged 76)
- Occupation: Singer

Will Oakland (January 15, 1880 – May 15, 1956) was an American countertenor famed for his exceptionally high vocal range. He was born Herman Hinrichs in Jersey City, New Jersey, to German-American immigrant parents.

Oakland began his musical career after leaving the United States Army in 1905, joining Lew Dockstader's minstrels in Rochester, New York. He began recording for Edison Records in 1908, soon after Richard Jose's retirement. In addition to appearing as a solo performer, Oakland recorded duets with Billy Murray, sometimes singing the female part in love songs. He often sang woeful, sentimental songs that contrasted with Murray's usually upbeat repertoire.

From 1912 to 1914 Oakland recorded in the Heidelberg Quintet, joining the members of the American Quartet.

He recorded the song "As I sat upon my dear old mother's knee" by Joseph P. Skelly.
