= Albert Campbell (singer) =

American singer (1872–1947)

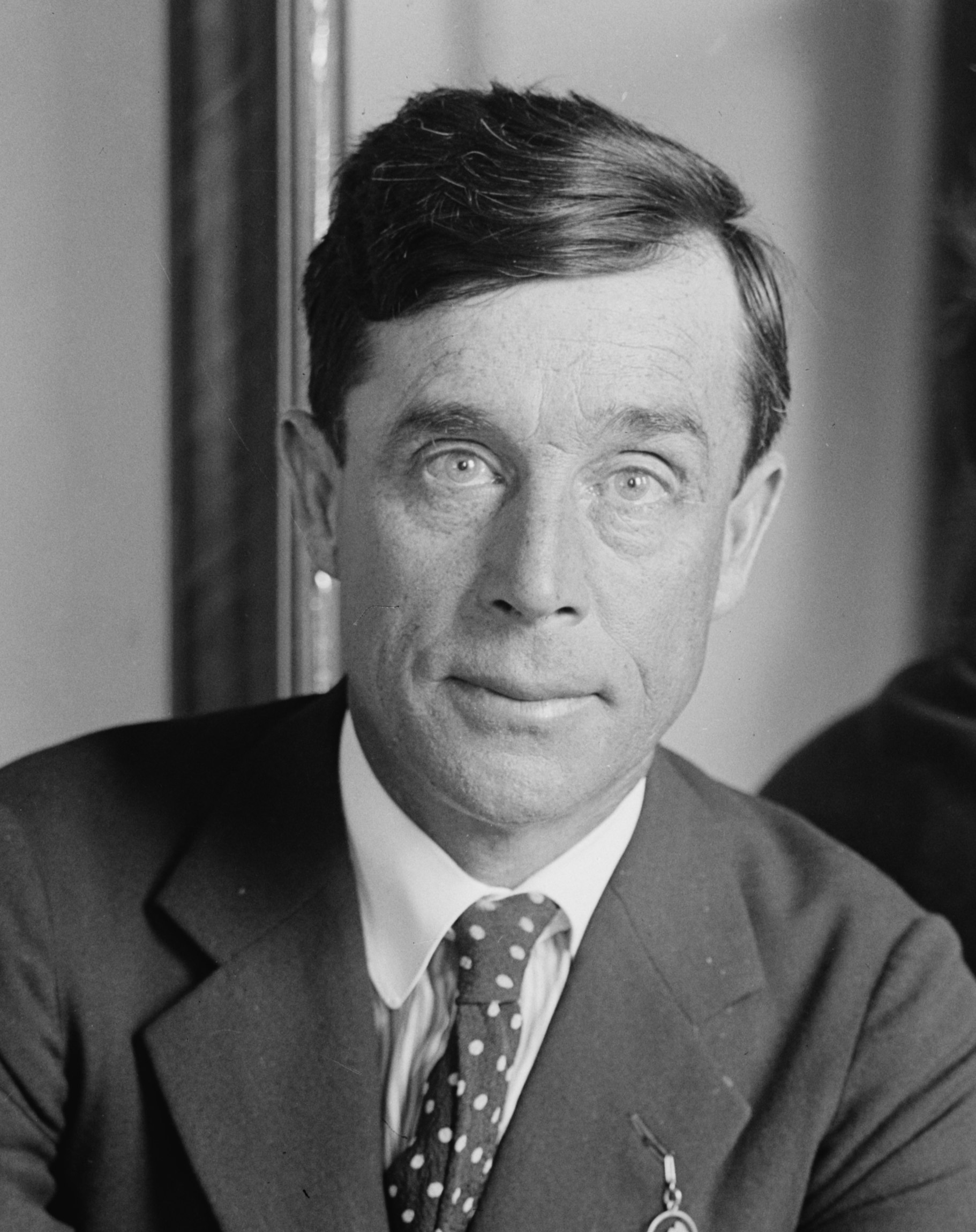
Campbell (c. 1920–25)

Albert Charles Campbell (August 17, 1872 – January 25, 1947) was an American popular music singer who recorded between the late 1890s and the 1920s. He was best known for his many duo recordings with Henry Burr, and as a member of the Peerless Quartet and other vocal groups, but also recorded successfully as a solo singer both under his own name and under various pseudonyms including Frank Howard.

== Biography ==
He was born in Brooklyn, New York, and while in his teens worked for the music publishers Edward B. Marks and Jos. W. Stern. When Marks and Stern organized the Universal Phonograph Company in early 1897, Campbell began recording for them as part of the Diamond Quartette (aka Diamond Four) and Diamond Comedy Four (with Steve Porter, Jim Reynard and Billy Jones). These groups soon began recording discs for the Berliner Gramophone Co., and Campbell began recording solo vocal records for Reed, Dawson & Co., the Norcross Phonograph Co., Berliner Gramophone, Columbia Phonograph Co. and Edison's National Phonograph Co. Among his early solo successes were "My Wild Irish Rose" (recorded for both Berliner and Edison, 1899); "Ma Blushin' Rosie" (recorded for Berliner Records, 1900); and "Love Me and the World Is Mine" (for Victor, 1906).

Campbell also recorded, after the late 1890s, as part of the Columbia Male Quartet, which after 1907 became more generally known as the Peerless Quartet. The group was the most commercially successful of the acoustic era, and at the peak of their popularity, between about 1911 and 1917, also featured tenor Henry Burr, baritone Arthur Collins, and bass John Meyer. Their most successful recordings over the period included "I Want A Girl (Just Like The Girl That Married Dear Old Dad)" (1911); "I Didn't Raise My Boy To Be A Soldier" (1915); and "Over There" (1917).

Campbell made few solo recordings after 1907, but formed a highly successful recording partnership with Henry Burr. The pair had a succession of major commercial hits between 1911 and 1925. These included "When I was Twenty-One and You Were Sweet Sixteen" (recorded for Columbia, 1912); "The Trail of the Lonesome Pine" (Columbia, 1913); "I'm On My Way To Mandalay" (Columbia, Edison, Indestructible, and Victor, 1914); "Close to My Heart" (Columbia, 1915); "There's a Quaker Down In Quaker Town" (Victor, 1916); "Lookout Mountain" (Columbia and Victor, 1917); "Till We Meet Again" (Columbia, Emerson, and Paramount, 1919); and "I'm Forever Blowing Bubbles" (Columbia and OKeh, 1919).

Campbell and Burr, together with John Meyer and Frank Croxton, continued to perform and record as the Peerless Quartet with some success until 1925, when the group disbanded. Campbell then formed a duo with Jack Kaufman; They recorded on Harmony, Edison, Grey Gull, Cameo/Romeo, Perfect, and Gennett/Challenge, sometimes as "Murphy and Shea", "Collins and Reynolds", or "Wheeler and Morse".

Albert Campbell died in New York in 1947 at the age of 74.
