= Oh, You Beautiful Doll =

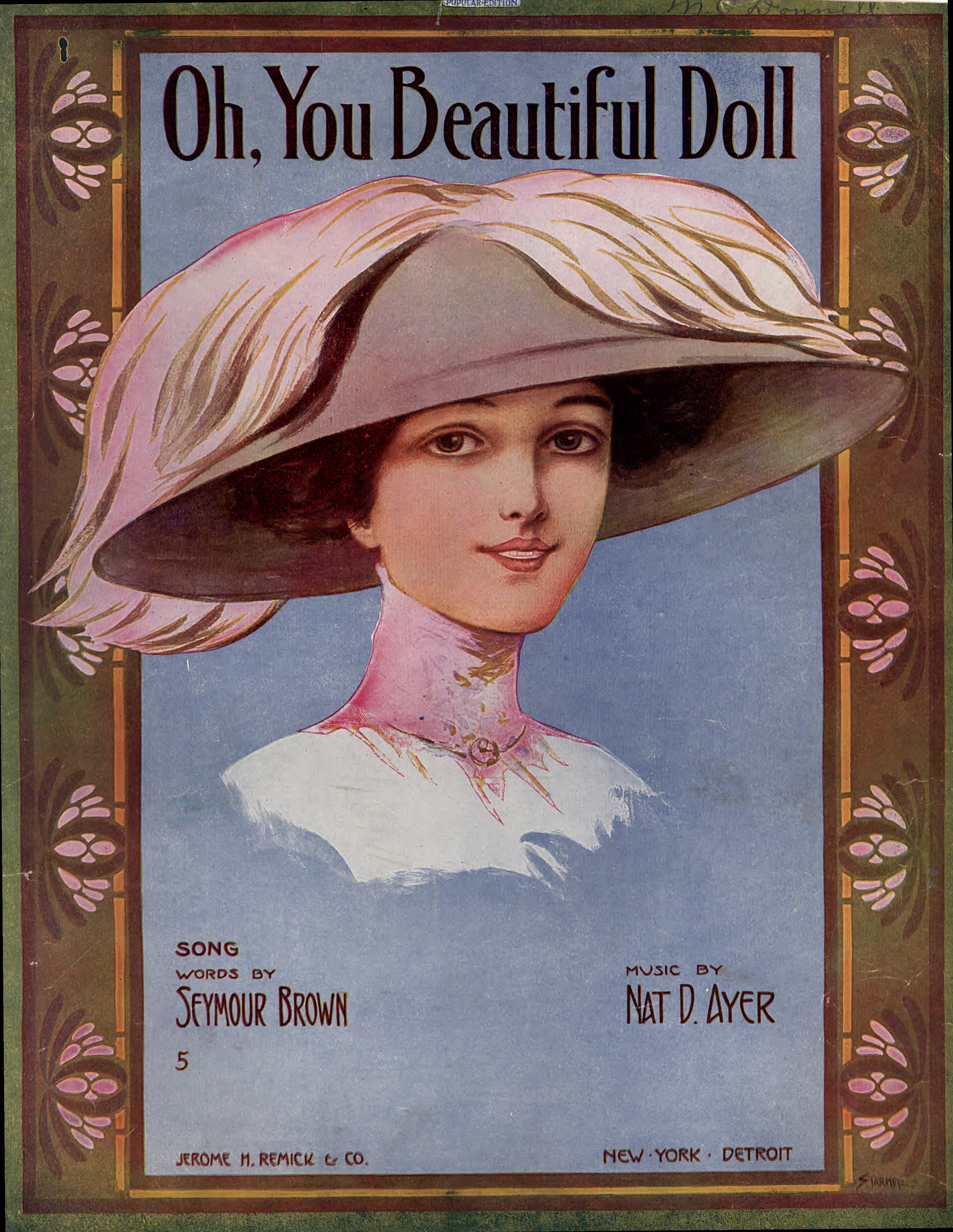
- Sheet music cover illustrated by William Austin Starmer (1878–1962)

Song
- Published: 1911
- Genre: Ragtime
- Composers: Nat D. Ayer (né Nathaniel Davis Ayer; 1887–1952)
- Lyricist: Albert Seymour Brown (1885–1947)

"Oh, You Beautiful Doll" is a ragtime love song published in 1911 with words by Albert Seymour Brown (1885–1947) and music by Nat D. Ayer. The song has been recorded hundreds of times by many artists from first publication until recent times.

== Song form ==
The song, "Oh, You Beautiful Doll" – in the key of E♭ major and in common time – opens with a four-bar I–vi–ii–V–I progression, followed by a two-bar vamp. Next, a 12-bar verse, where the vocal begins, is repeated, for a total of 24 bars. The song then modulates to A♭ major for the 20-bar refrain, which is also repeated, with first and second endings. With repeats, and the vamp played only once, the song has 50 bars of notated music.

The song was composed prior to the widespread adoption of the 32-bar AABA form that became characteristic of Tin Pan Alley popular songs during the 1920s (see Great American Songbook). Popular songs of the period were less standardized in form; earlier Tin Pan Alley songs commonly used verse-and-refrain structures, with ABAC among the prevalent forms.

== Lyrics ==
=== Verse 1 ===
Honey dear, want you near,
Just turn out the light and then come over here,
Nestle close, up to my side,
My heart's on fire, with love's desire.

In my arms, rest complete,
I never thought that life could ever be so sweet,
'til I met you some time ago,
But now I know I love you so.

=== Chorus ===
Oh! you beautiful doll,
You great big beautiful doll!
Let me put my arms about you,
I could never live without you;

Oh! you beautiful doll,
You great big beautiful doll!
If you ever leave me how my heart will ache,
I want to hug you but I fear you'd break

Oh, oh, oh, oh,
Oh, you beautiful doll!

=== Second verse ===
Precious prize, close your eyes,
Now we're goin' to visit lover's paradise,
Press your lips again to mine,
Love is king of ev'ry thing,

Squeeze me dear, I don't care!
Hug me just as if you were a grizzly bear,
This is how I'll go through life,
No care or strife, when you're my wife.

== Notable use in film ==
As well as being used in the 1949 film of the same name, the tune had been featured in several major movies — The Story of Vernon and Irene Castle (1939), For Me and My Gal (1942), Broadway Rhythm (1944), Strangers on a Train (1951), The Eddie Cantor Story (1953), and The FBI Story (1959), as well as numerous Looney Tunes cartoons such as Hair-Raising Hare. The Kidsongs Kids and Billy and Ruby Biggle sang this song with a baby elephant named Belle in their 1995 video and DVD, Baby Animal Songs. The song also appears on the animated series Hey Arnold! where Grandpa Phil sings the song while taking a shower, as well as in the last Fred Astaire variety special, in which he and dance partner Barrie Chase danced to it. It appears in Somewhere in Time (1980), starring Christopher Reeve and Jane Seymour, during a scene where Reeve and Seymour dance briefly. The song was showcased in the climax of the 1981 film, ... All the Marbles, starring Peter Falk.

== Other recordings ==
- 1911 – Billy Murray and The American Quartet recorded the song on September 29, 1911. It was released on Victor 16979.
- 1949 – Earle Spencer, Black & White Records, BW730-3
- 1954 – John Serry Sr. and his accordion ensemble for RCA Victor (See "RCA Thesaurus").
- 1966 – Nancy Sinatra, covered the song for her 1967 album Sugar.

== Bibliography ==
=== References ===
- Appen, Ralf von [in German]; Frei-Hauenschild, Markus (1963–2019) (10 March 2015). "AABA, Refrain, Chorus, Bridge, Prechorus – Song Forms and Their Historical Development". Vol. 13. Ralf von Appen, André Doehring (born in 1973), Thomas Phleps (1955–2017), eds. Justus Liebig University Giessen (JLU), Faculty 03, Social and Cultural Sciences. Musicology / Music Education: Online-Publikationen der Gesellschaft für Popularmusikforschung / German Society for Popular Music Studies e.V. pp. 1–83. doi:10.22029/jlupub-849; OCLC 907093747.
- Ayer, Nat D. (music); Brown, A. Seymour [at Wikidata] (1911). "Oh, You Beautiful Doll" (sheet music). New York: Jerome H. Remick & Co. (1911).
- Eastman School of Music. "John Serry Sextette" (PDF). Audio recording for RCA Thesaurus of arrangements and performances by John Serry at the RCA Victor Studios in 1954. University of Rochester, Eastman School of Music, Sibley Music Library, John J. Serry Sr. Collection. pp. 18–19.
- Eastman School of Music. Search term: "S". John J. Serry Sr. Collection "John Serry Sextette" audio recording for RCA Thesaurus of arrangements and performances by John Serry at the RCA Victor Studios in 1954. University of Rochester, Eastman School of Music, Sibley Music Library, John J. Serry Sr. Collection. p. 18.
