= Corinne Morgan =

American musician (1876–1942)

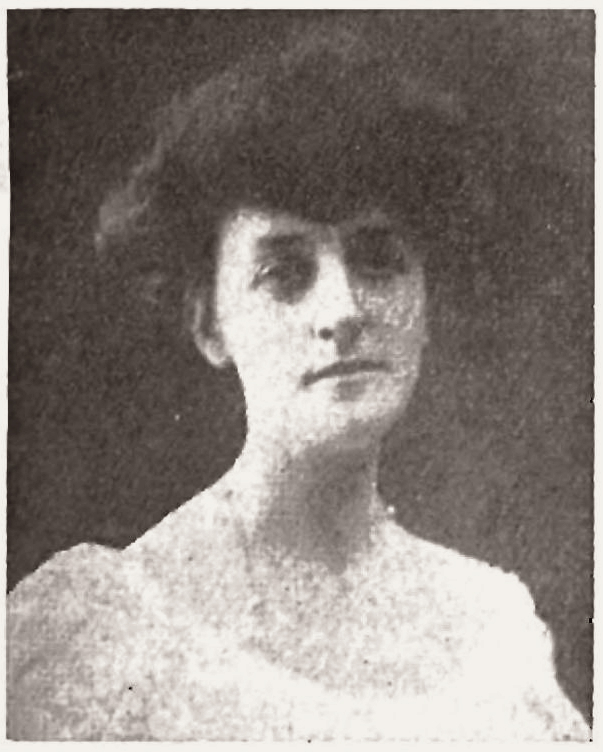
- Morgan, around 1911, from Edison Phonograph Monthly (UK)

Background information
- Birth name: Corinne Welsh
- Born: February 16, 1876; Commercial Point, Ohio, United States
- Died: March 23, 1942 (aged 66); Ohio, US
- Genres: Popular music
- Occupation: Singer

Corinne Morgan (16 February 1876 – March 23, 1942) was the stage name of Corinne (or Cora) Welsh. She was a contralto singer and pioneer recording artist who recorded popular songs in the early years of the twentieth century and was best known for her duets with Frank Stanley. Some sources misspell her name as Corrine.

She was born in Commercial Point, Ohio, the daughter of John C. Welsh, a farmer, and later moved to New York City. In 1902, she started recording for the major cylinder recording companies of the day, including Edison and Columbia, although after 1904 most of her recordings were for Victor Records. She was one of the first female singers to record regularly, and mainly recorded sentimental rather than comic songs. Her successful duets with Frank Stanley included "It's a Lovely Day for a Walk" (1903), "Listen to the Mocking Bird" (1904), and "When You and I Were Young, Maggie" (1905). She also recorded with the Haydn Quartet on "Toyland" (from the operetta Babes In Toyland, 1904), "Dearie" (1905) and "How'd You Like to Spoon with Me?" (1906). Her solo recordings included "So Long, Mary" (1906), and "Lullaby" (1907).

She does not seem to have recorded after 1909, although there is a rendition of Just A-Wearyin' For You on the Emerson label (catalogue number 10464) dating to late 1921/early 1922, and with label credit given to Corinne Morgan Welsh. She worked as a professional singer until at least 1919. In 1923, she married Charles Walter DuMont. She died on March 23, 1942, at the age of 66, though some sources give her year of death as 1945.
