= Moonlight Bay =

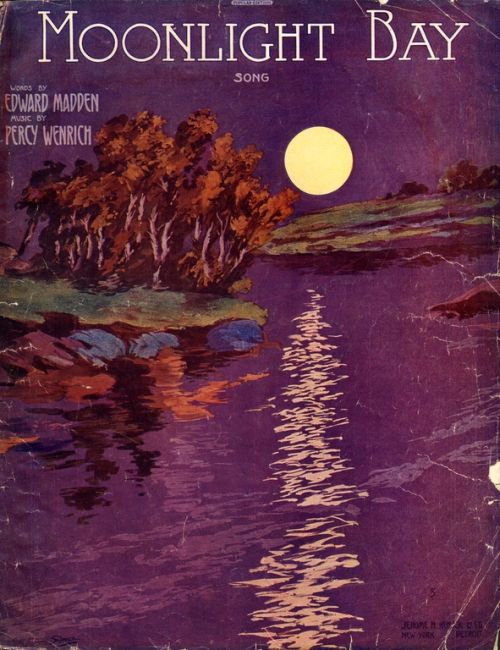
- Cover, sheet music, 1912

Song
- Language: English
- Published: 1912
- Songwriters: Composer: Percy Wenrich; Lyricist: Edward Madden

Audio sample
- Recording of Moonlight Bay, performed by the American Quartet (1911): file; help

"Moonlight Bay" is a popular song. It is commonly referred to as "On Moonlight Bay". The lyrics were written by Edward Madden, the music by Percy Wenrich, and was published in 1912. It is often sung in a barbershop quartet style. Early successful recordings in 1912 were by the American Quartet and by Dolly Connolly.

== Notable covers ==
- Glenn Miller and his Orchestra recorded the song on March 22, 1937, with a special swing arrangement by Miller.
- The song was featured in the film Tin Pan Alley (1940), where it was sung by Alice Faye. Faye also included the song in her 1962 album Alice Faye Sings Her Greatest Movie Hits.
- The song, sung in barbershop quartet style, features in the first Daffy Duck cartoon, Porky's Duck Hunt (1937).
- Porky Pig repeatedly tries to sing the song in the 1942 cartoon My Favorite Duck.
- The Mills Brothers recorded the song in 1940 for Decca Records.
- The song was featured in the musical film On Moonlight Bay (1951) and gave the film its title; it was sung by Doris Day and Gordon MacRae. Day also recorded the song commercially, and it appeared on her 1951 album On Moonlight Bay, featuring songs from the film.
- A duet performance by Bing Crosby and Gary Crosby was recorded on March 22, 1951, and reached No. 14 in the Billboard charts in 1951.
- The Beatles performed "Moonlight Bay" with comedians Eric Morecambe and Ernie Wise on the duo's ATV programme Two of a Kind in December 1963. A recording of the performance was released on the Beatles' album Anthology 1 in 1995.
- The song was sung in episodes of Hey Arnold!
- In the 1942 film Ship Ahoy, Tommy Dorsey leads his orchestra while Eleanor Powell does a tap dance conveying a message in Morse code.

== Verses ==
Voices hum, crooning over Moonlight Bay
Banjos strum, tuning while the moonbeams play
All alone, unknown they find me
Memories like these remind me
Of the girl I left behind me
Down on Moonlight Bay

Candle lights gleaming on the silent shore
Lonely nights, dreaming till we meet once more
Far apart, her heart, is yearning
With a sigh for my returning
With the light of love still burning
As in days of yore

== Chorus ==
We were sailing along
On Moonlight Bay.
We could hear the voices ringing;
They seemed to say,
"You have stolen my heart"
"Now don't go 'way!"
As we sang "Love's Old Sweet Song"
On Moonlight Bay

The original sheet music and 1912 recordings use the lyrics above.
