= Harry Macdonough =

Canadian singer

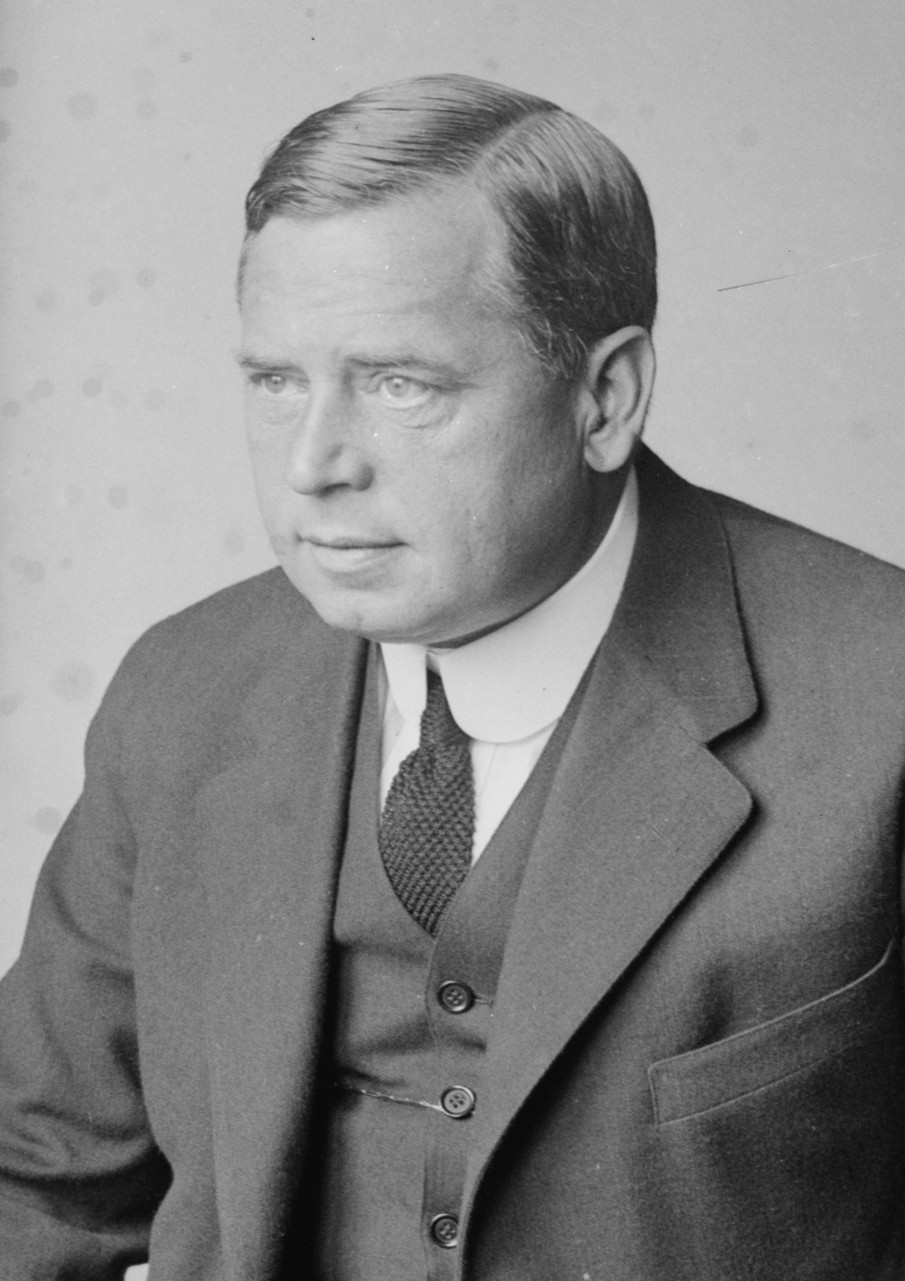
- A picture of Macdonough from Bain News Service.

Background information
- Born: John Scantlebury Macdonald; May 30, 1871; Hamilton, Ontario, Canada
- Died: September 26, 1931 (aged 60) New York City, New York, United States
- Genres: Pop
- Occupations: Singer, studio manager, label executive
- Years active: 1898/99-1920
- Labels: Edison, Victor, Columbia Records
- On the Bank of the Wabash, Far Away Written by Paul Dresser, recorded by Macdonough for Edison Records, c. 1902

John Scantlebury Macdonald (May 30, 1871 – September 26, 1931), known professionally as Harry Macdonough, was a Canadian-born singer and recording executive. He was one of the most prolific and popular tenors during the formative years of the recording industry. His most popular recordings included “Shine On, Harvest Moon” (with Elise Stevenson), “Down By The Old Mill Stream”, “They Didn’t Believe Me” (with Olive Kline), “Tell Me, Pretty Maiden” (with Grace Spencer), and “Where The River Shannon Flows”.

== Music career ==
Macdonald was born in Hamilton, Ontario, Canada. His earliest recorded performances were for the Michigan Electric Company in Detroit, which made phonograph cylinders for penny arcades. He caught the attention of Edison Records with a demo recording he made in October 1898, and began recording for Edison in the Haydn Quartet. From 1899 until his retirement in 1920, he recorded hundreds of songs both as a soloist and in ensembles.

One of Macdonald's lesser-known performances is for performing "Tessie", then billed as "Tessie (You Are the Only Only Only)" from the Broadway musical The Silver Slipper in 1903, becoming a rallying cry for the Boston Red Sox until 1918 and starting again in 2004 during the World Series.

During the 1900s, Macdonald took a job with the Victor Talking Machine Company, becoming assistant manager and later manager of its New York City studio. As studio manager he oversaw the studio schedule, as well as negotiating contracts with artists and music publishers. In October 1913, he recorded a duet with the American singer Marguerite Dunlap of "When It's Apple Blossom Time in Normandy". Macdonald rose rapidly at Victor, becoming its national sales manager in 1920 and manager of artists and repertoire in 1923. He moved to Columbia Records in 1925 and oversaw the technical development of its studios until his death.
