= 1907 in music =

This is a list of notable events in music that took place in the year 1907.

== Specific locations ==
- 1907 in Norwegian music

== Events ==
- January 27 – Executives of the Metropolitan Opera removes Richard Strauss's Salome from the repertoire following protests that the opera was indecent.
- February 3 – Josef Suk's first performance of Symphony č.2 C moll (Asrael) in the National Theatre in Prague, Karel Kovarovic conducting.
- February 7 – Jules Massenet's Therese is produced in Monte Carlo.
- February 20 – The Legend of the Invisible City of Kitezh and the Maiden Fevroniya by Nicolai Rimsky-Korsakov premieres at the Mariinsky Theatre in Saint Petersburg.
- February 21 – Frederick Delius' opera Romeo and Julia auf dem Dorf has its premiere at the Komische Oper Berlin.
- February 22 - Maurice Ravel's Introduction and Allegro for harp, string quartet, flute and clarinet premieres at the Cercle Masical in Paris.
- March 1 - Claude Debussy's La Mer receives its American premiere as it is performed by Karl Muck and the Boston Symphony Orchestra.
- March 19 - Edward Elgar conducts a New York performance of his oratio The Apostles with the Ontario Society of New York City.
- April 20 - Vincent d'Indy's symphonic work dedicated to the memory of his wife, Souvenirs premieres in Paris.
- April 23 - Excerpts from Arthur Nevin's opera Poia are premiered at the White House. President Theodore Roosevelt listens as the composer performs at the piano in the absence of an orchestra.
- April 27 - Igor Stravinski's Symphony No.1 E-flat receives its first private performance in Saint Peterburg at a private concert
- May 10 – Ariane et Barbe-Bleue, by Paul Dukas by the libretto based on the play by Maurice Maeterlinck, premiers at the Paris Opéra-Comique
- May 16 – The first of series of five concerts is presented by Serge Diaghilev in Paris, featuring Russian music, including works of Nikolai Rimski-Korsakov, Alexander Glazunov, Mikhail Glinka, Alexander Borodin, Modest Mussorgsky and others. Feodor Chaliapin sings operatic excerpts, creating a sensation.
- May 27 – Bach House (Eisenach) opens in what is at this time believed to be the birthplace of Johann Sebastian Bach, the first museum devoted to a single composer.
- June 12 – Cambridge University awards the honorary degree of Doctor of Music to Alexander Glazunov.
- June 18 – Oxford University awards the honorary degree of Doctor of Music to Alexander Glazunov.
- June 26 – Cambridge University awards the honorary degree of Doctor of Music to Camille Saint-Saens.
- August 24 - Edward Elgar's Pomp and Circumstance No.4 premiers at London.
- September 25 – Jean Sibelius conducts the world première of his Symphony No. 3 in C major Op.52 in Helsinki.
- September 27 - Norfolk Rhapsody No.2 and Norfolk Rhapsody No.3 by Ralph Vaughan Williams, are premiered at the Cardiff Festival.
- October 8 - Edvard Grieg's Olaf Trygvason, his only opera, is produced posthumously in Kristiania, Norway
- November 9 – Umberto Giordano's Marcella is peroduced at La Scala in Milan. The opera, in three episodes, is about the love affair between an artist and his model.
- Publication of Sketch of a New Aesthetic of Music by Ferruccio Busoni.
- November 15 - Donald MacBride recorded the earliest example of a solo recording by a chorister from the USA, at St Thomas Fifth Avenue, singing Handel's 'Angels Ever Bright and Fair'.
- November 20 – Feodor Chaliapin makes his American debut at the Metropolitan Opera house in Mefistofele
- Cosima Wagner steps down from her position as head of the Bayreuth Festival. She is succeeded by her son Siegfried.

== Published popular music ==
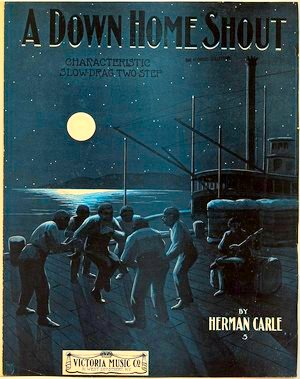
The cover of Herman Carle's "Down Home Shout"

"Heliotrope Bouquet"
Louis Chauvin and Scott Joplin's "Heliotrope Bouquet" being performed by a pianist circa 2007.

- "All She Gets from the Iceman is Ice" w. Arthur J. Lamb m. Alfred Solman
- "And A Little Bit More" w. Alfred Bryan m. Fred Fisher
- "Ballooning" w. Paul West m. Jerome Kern
- "The Bandolero" w. m. Leslie Stuart
- "Be My Little Teddy Bear" w. Vincent Bryan m. Max Hoffman
- "Because I'm Married Now" w.m. Herbert Ingraham
- "Bon Bon Buddy" by Alex Rogers
- "Brother Noah Gave Out Checks For Rain" w.m. Arthur Longbrake
- "Budweiser's A Friend Of Mine" w. Vincent P. Bryan m. Seymour Furth
- "Bye Bye Dearie" w. Andrew B. Sterling m. Harry Von Tilzer
- "The Caissons Go Rolling Along" m. Edmund L. Gruber
- "Come Along, My Mandy" w.m. Tom Mellor, Alfred J. Lawrence & Harry Gifford New words Nora Bayes & Jack Norworth 1910
- "Don't Worry" w.m. Ed Rose & Ted Snyder
- "Down Home Shout" Herman Carle
- "Fairy Queen" m. Percy Wenrich
- "Fishing For the Moon" David Kilburn Stevens
- "Gladiolus Rag" by Scott Joplin
- "Harrigan" w.m. George M. Cohan. Introduced by George M. Cohan in the musical Fifty Miles from Boston
- "He Goes to Church on Sunday" w. Vincent Bryan m. E. Ray Goetz
- "He Was One Of The Boys" w.m. T. W. Connor
- "Heliotrope Bouquet" Louis Chauvin and Scott Joplin
- "Honey Boy" w. Jack Norworth m. Albert Von Tilzer
- "I Love You So" w. Adrian Ross m. Franz Lehár
- "I Wish I Had A Girl" w. Gus Kahn m. Grace LeBoy
- "I'm Afraid to Come Home in the Dark" w. Harry H. Williams m. Egbert Van Alstyne
- "I'm Tying The Leaves So They Won't Come Down" w. E. S. S. Huntingdon m. J. Fred Helf
- "In A Hammock Built For Two" w. Andrew B. Sterling m. Harry von Tilzer
- "In the Land of the Buffalo" Williams, Van Alstyne
- "In Washington" w. Vincent Bryan m. Gertrude H. Hoffman
- "It's Delightful To Be Married" w. Anna Held m. Vincent Scotto
- "Just Because He Couldn't Sing "Love Me And The World Is Mine"" w.m. Bert Fitzgibbon
- "Kansas City Rag" by James Scott
- "Marie From Sunny Italy" w. Irving Berlin m. M. Nicholson
- "Mariutch Down At Coney Island" (a.k.a. "Mariutch Dance Da Hootch-A-Ma-Kootch") w. Andrew B. Sterling m. Harry von Tilzer
- "(You'll Find Me At) Maxim's" w. Adrian Ross m. Franz Lehár
- "Meet Me Down At The Corner" w. Will D. Cobb m. Harry Hoyt
- "(The Best I Get Is) Much Obliged To You" w.m. Benjamin Hapgood Burt
- "'Neath The Old Acorn Tree, Sweet Estelle" w. C. M. Denison m. J. Fred Helf
- "'Neath The Old Cherry Tree, Sweet Marie" w.m. Harry Williams & Egbert van Alstyne
- "No, No, Positively No" w.m. Chris Smith & Harry Brown
- "Not For Me" w.m. Bessie Wynn
- "On The Road To Mandalay" w. Rudyard Kipling m. Oley Speaks
- "The Peach That Tastes The Sweetest Hangs The Highest On The Tree" w. Will D. Cobb m. Gus Edwards
- "Pride Of The Prairie" w. Harry Breen m. George Botsford
- "Put Me Among The Girls" w. C. W. Murphy m. Dan Lipton

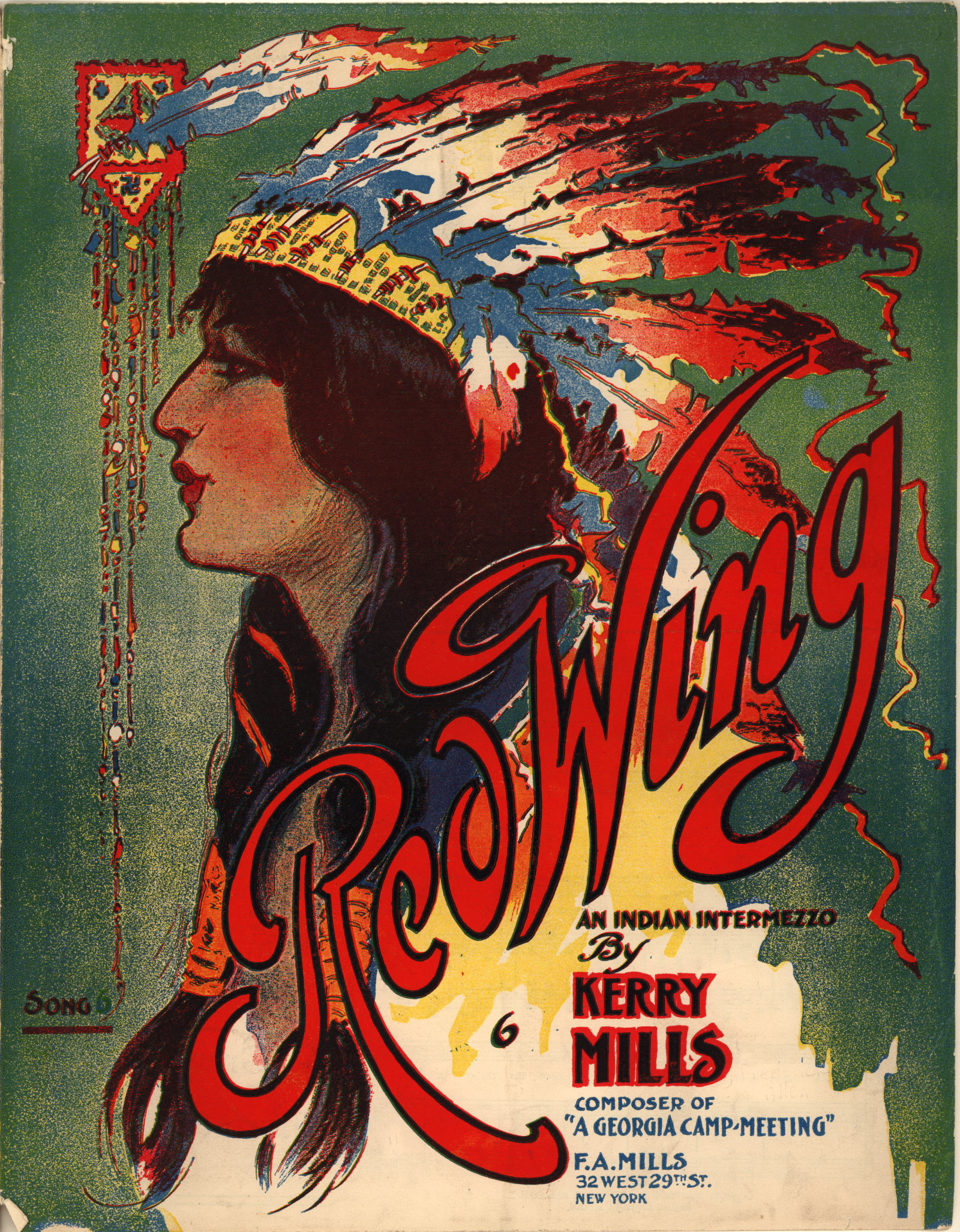

- "Rain-in-the-Face" by Benjamin Hapgood Burt
- "Red Wing" w. Thurland Chattaway m. Kerry Mills
- "Rum-Tiddley-Um-Tum-Tay Out For The Day Today" w. Fred Leigh m. Orlando Powell
- "San Antonio" w.m. Harry Williams & Egbert van Alstyne
- "Sandy, You're A Dandy" w.m. Hector Grant
- "Searchlight Rag" by Scott Joplin
- "Somebody's Been Around Here Since I've Been Gone" m. John Walter Bratton
- "Somebody's Waiting For You" w. Vincent Bryan m. Albert Gumble
- "Take Me Back To New York Town" w. Andrew B. Sterling m. Harry Von Tilzer
- "Take Me Where There's A Big Brass Band" Morse
- "The Teddy Bears' Picnic" w. James B. Kennedy m. John Walter Bratton (Words 1932)
- "Theodore" w.m. Vincent Bryan
- "There Never Was A Girl Like You" w. Harry H. Williams m. Egbert Van Alstyne
- "Tipperary" w. Leo Curley m. James M. Fulton & J. Fred Helf
- "Tommy, Lad!" w. Edward Teschemacher m. E. J. Margetson
- "Two Blue Eyes" by Edward Madden
- "Two Little Baby Shoes" w. Edward Madden m. Theodore F. Morse
- "Vilia" w. Adrian Ross m. Franz Lehár
- "Wal, I Swan!" (a.k.a. "Ebeneezer Frye") w.m. Benjamin Hapgood Burt
- "'Way Down In Colon Town" Hoffman
- "When A Fellow's On The Level With A Girl That's On The Square" w.m. George M. Cohan from the musical The Talk Of New York
- "Who? Me?" Snyder
- "Will the Circle Be Unbroken?" w. Ada R. Habershon m. Charles H. Gabriel
- "Won't You Be My Honey?" w. Jack Drislane m. Theodore F. Morse
- "You Splash Me And I'll Splash You" w. Arthur J. Lamb m. Alfred Solman

== Classical music ==
- Hugo Alfvén – Swedish Rhapsody No. 2, Op. 24 (Uppsalarapsodi)
- York Bowen –
  - Piano Concerto No. 3 "Fantasia" Op. 23
  - Viola Concerto in C minor Op. 25 ()
- Havergal Brian – English Suite
- Frederick Delius – Songs of Sunset; Brigg Fair
- Ernő Dohnányi – String Quartet No. 2 in D-flat, Op. 15
- Edward Elgar – The Wand of Youth
- Reinhold Glière – Symphony No. 2 in C minor
- Gustav Holst – A Somerset Rhapsody
- Sylvio Lazzari – Symphony in E-flat
- Henryk Melcer-Szczawiński – Violin Sonata in G ()
- Sergei Rachmaninoff –
  - Symphony No. 2 in E minor
  - Piano Sonata No. 1 in D minor
- Maurice Ravel -
  - Histoires naturelles
  - Une Barque sur l'ocean
- Max Reger – Piano Trio in E minor, Op. 102
- Ottorino Respighi – Quartet for Strings in D major
- Arnold Schoenberg -
  - String Quartet No.1 in D Minor, Op.7
  - Kammersymphonie, Op.9
- Alexander Scriabin – Piano Sonata No. 5, Op.53
- Jean Sibelius – Symphony No. 3 in C major, Op. 52
- Charles Villiers Stanford – Stabat Mater
- Igor Stravinsky - Symphony in Eb, Op. 1
- Josef Suk – Symphony No. 2 in C minor, Op. 27 (Asrael)
- Joaquín Turina – Piano Quintet, Op.1

== Opera ==
- Francesco Cilea – Gloria
- Frederick Delius – A Village Romeo and Juliet, Berlin, February 21.
- Paul Dukas - Ariane et Barbe-Bleue, Paris, May 10
- Umberto Giordano - Marcella, La Scala, November 9
- Luigi Mancinelli – Paolo e Francesca
- Jules Massenet – Thérèse
- Nikolai Rimsky-Korsakov – Le Coq d'Or
- Nikolai Rimsky-Korsakov – The Legend of the Invisible City of Kitezh and the Maiden Fevroniya

== Dance ==
- Frederic Chopin - Les Sylphides (originally called Chopiniana), St.Petersburg, February 23.
- Camille Saint-Saens - The Dying Swan (solo dance for Anna Pavlova), St.Petersburg, December 22.
- Nikolai Tcherepnin - The Animated Goblins, St.Petersburg, April 28.
- Nikolai Tcherepnin - Le Pavillon d'Armide, St.Petersburg, November 25.

== Musical theater ==
- Die Dollarprinzessin Vienna production
- Follies of 1907 Broadway production
- The Gay Gordons, with a book by Seymour Hicks, music by Guy Jones and lyrics by Arthur Wimperis, C. H. Bovill, Henry Hamilton and P. G. Wodehouse. It opened at London's Aldwych Theatre on 11 September.
- The Gay White Way Broadway revue opened at the Casino Theatre on October 7 and ran for 105 performances
- The Girls of Gottenberg London production opened at the Gaiety Theatre on May 15 and ran for 303 performances. Starring May de Sousa, George Grossmith Jr., Gertie Millar, Robert Nainby and Edmund Payne.
- Franz Lehár – The Merry Widow London and Broadway productions
- The Merry Farmer Mannheim production
- Miss Hook of Holland London and Broadway productions
- Nelly Neil London production
- The Orchid Broadway production
- The Rogers Brothers in Panama Broadway production
- The Talk of New York Broadway production opened at the Knickerbocker Theatre on December 3 and ran for 157 performances.
- The Time, the Place and the Girl – Broadway production
- Ein Walzertraum (A Waltz Dream) Vienna and Berlin productions

== Births ==
- January 4 – Thrasybulos Georgiades, Greek musicologist (died 1977)
- January 7 – Nicanor Zabaleta, Spanish harpist (died 1993)
- January 16 – Martin Scherber, composer and music teacher (died 1974)
- January 17 – Henk Badings, Dutch composer (died 1987)
- February 1 – Günter Eich, German lyricist (died 1972)
- February 1 – Sándor Veress, Swiss-Hungarian composer born in Indonesia (died 1992)
- February 13 – Katy de la Cruz, Filipino singer (died 2004)
- February 15 – Jean Langlais, French organist and composer (died 1991)
- February 26 – Harry Gold, British dixieland jazz saxophonist and bandleader (died 2005)
- February 27 – Mildred Bailey, US singer (died 1951)
- March 3 – Joy Finzi, wife of Gerald Finzi and founder of the Finzi Trust (died 1991)
- March 11 – Jessie Matthews, British actress and singer (died 1981)
- March 14 – Tolibjon Sadikov, Uzbek composer (died 1957)
- March 15 – Zarah Leander, Swedish singer and actress (died 1981)
- March 19 – Elizabeth Maconchy, English composer (died 1994)
- April 2 – Alfredo Giovine, Italian music historian (died 1995)
- April 12 – Imogen Holst, British conductor and composer (died 1984)
- April 18 – Miklós Rózsa, Hungarian-American film composer (died 1995)
- April 21 – Beatrice Kay, US singer and actress (died 1986)
- April 29 – Tino Rossi, French singer and actor (died 1983)
- May 1 – Kate Smith, US singer (died 1986)
- May 5 – Yoritsune Matsudaira, Japanese composer (died 2001)
- May 10 – Harilaos Perpessas, Greek composer (d. 1995)
- May 14 – Edythe Wright, US singer (died 1965)
- May 18
  - Gonzalo Brenes, Panamanian composer, musicologist, folk-song collector, music educator, and politician (died 2003)
  - Clifford Curzon, English pianist (died 1982)
- June 14 – Sid Phillips, jazz clarinetist, bandleader, and arranger (died 1973)
- June 22 – Ernest "Doc" Paulin, American trumpeter (died 2007)
- July 17 - Kathleen Riddick, British conductor (died 1973)
- July 19 – Günter Bialas, German composer (died 1995)
- July 26 – André Gertler, Hungarian violinist (died 1998)
- August 3 – Lawrence Brown, US jazz trombonist (died 1988)
- August 8 – Benny Carter, US jazz saxophonist, composer, arranger and bandleader (died 2003)
- August 15 – Bob Pearson, British pianist and singer, part of Bob and Alf Pearson double act (died 1985)
- August 20 – Anatole Fistoulari, Russian composer (died 1995)
- August 21 – Hy Zaret, songwriter (died 2007)
- September 29 – Gene Autry, US singer and performer (died 1998)
- October 1 – Ödön Pártos, Hungarian-born Israeli violist, composer (died 1977)
- October 5 – Mrs. Miller, American singer (died 1997)
- October 6 – Francisco Gabilondo Soler, Mexican singer and composer (died 1990)
- October 12 – Wolfgang Fortner, German composer (died 1987)
- October 19 – Roger Wolfe Kahn, American jazz and popular musician, composer, and bandleader (died 1962)
- October 24 – Rafael Godoy, Colombian composer (died 1973)
- October 27 – Helmut Walcha, German organist (died 1991)
- November 17 – James Moody, composer for harmonica (died 1995)
- November 18 – Compay Segundo, Cuban singer and songwriter, inventor of the armónico (died 2003)
- November 30 – György Ránki, Hungarian composer (died 1992)
- December 7 – Wanda Toscanini, daughter of Arturo Toscanini and wife of Vladimir Horowitz (died 1998)
- December 25 – Cab Calloway, US jazz singer and band leader (died 1994)
- December 27 – Willem van Otterloo, Dutch composer and conductor (died 1978)
- date unknown
  - Seán Reid, Irish Uilleann piper (died 1978)
  - N. Senada, German composer and music theorist (died 1993)

== Deaths ==
- January 19 – Beniamino Cesi, pianist, 62
- February 5 – Ludwig Thuille, composer, 45
- February 28 – Rosina Brandram, D'Oyly Carte singer and actress, 61
- March 1 – August Manns, conductor, 81
- March 17 – Ernesto Köhler, flautist and composer, 57
- April 3 – Désirée Artôt, operatic soprano, 71
- April 4 – Lucile Grahn, ballerina, 86
- June 1 – Richard Mühlfeld, clarinettist, 51
- June 2 – Anastazy Wilhelm Dreszer, pianist and composer, 62
- June 4 – Agathe Backer-Grøndahl, Norwegian pianist and composer, 59
- July 15 – Gustav Schirmer, American founder of the Boston Music Company, 43
- July 23 – William Shakespeare Hays, songwriter, 70
- August 15 – Joseph Joachim, violinist, composer, and conductor, 76
- September 4 – Edvard Grieg, Norwegian composer, 64
- September 5 – Adolf Østbye, first Norwegian recording artist, 39
- September 17 – Ignaz Brüll, Austrian pianist and composer, 60
- October 4 – Alfredo Keil, composer and painter, 57
- October 9 – Romualdo Marenco, composer, 66
- October 10 – Charles Dancla, violinist and composer, 89
- November 6 – Sophie Cruvelli, operatic soprano, 81
- November 8 – Marie Sasse, operatic soprano, 73
- November 15 – Antonie Mielke, operatic soprano, 51 (heart disease)
- November 21 – Gaetano Braga, cellist and composer, 78
- November 24 – Theodor Bertram, German opera singer, 38 (suicide)
- December 18 – Luscombe Searelle, composer and impresario, 54 (cancer)
