= Billy Murray (singer) =

American singer (1877-1954)

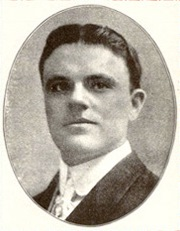
- Murray in May 1911

Background information
- Born: William Thomas Murray; May 25, 1877; Philadelphia, Pennsylvania, United States
- Origin: New York City
- Died: August 17, 1954 (aged 77) Jones Beach, New York, United States
- Genres: Tin Pan Alley, barbershop Quartet, Comedy, Jazz
- Occupation: Singer
- Instrument: Vocals
- Years active: 1893–1944
- Labels: Edison, OkeH, Victor Talking Machine Company, many others

William Thomas Murray (May 25, 1877 – August 17, 1954) was an American singer and voice actor. He was one of the most popular singers in the United States in the early 20th century. While he received star billing in Vaudeville, he was best known for his prolific work in the recording studio, making records for almost every record label of the era. Murray was the best-selling recording artist of the first quarter of the 20th century, selling over 300 million records during the phonograph era.

== Life and career ==
Billy Murray was born in Philadelphia, Pennsylvania, to Patrick and Julia (Kelleher) Murray, immigrants from County Kerry, Ireland. His parents moved to Denver, Colorado, in 1882, where he grew up. He became fascinated with the theater and joined a traveling vaudeville troupe in 1893. He also performed in minstrel shows early in his career. In 1897, Murray made his first recordings for Peter Bacigalupi, the owner of a phonograph company in San Francisco. As of 2025, none of Murray's cylinder records with Bacigalupi are known to have survived. In 1903, he started recording regularly in the New York City and New Jersey area, where major record companies in the U.S., as well as the Tin Pan Alley music industry, were concentrated.

In 1906, he recorded the first of his popular duets with Ada Jones. He also performed with Aileen Stanley, the Haydn Quartet, the American Quartet (also known as the Premier Quartet), and Elsie Baker; as well as performed solo work.

Nicknamed "The Denver Nightingale", Murray had a strong tenor voice with excellent enunciation and a conversational delivery compared with bel canto singers of the era. His delivery was so precise and pointed that his vocals were easy to understand and enjoy. This is why he was the favorite vocalist of Thomas Edison, whose impaired hearing made it difficult for him to appreciate recorded songs.

On comic songs, Billy Murray often deliberately sang slightly flat, which he felt helped the comic effect. Although he often performed romantic numbers and ballads which sold well, his comedy and novelty song recordings continue to be popular with later generations of record collectors.

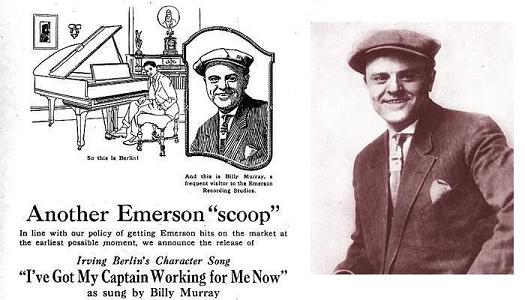
Murray in a newspaper ad from 1919

Murray was a devoted baseball fan, and he is said to have played with the New York Highlanders (Yankees) in exhibition games. He also supposedly sometimes called in sick to record sessions to go to the ballpark. Murray recorded "Tessie, You Are the Only, Only, Only", which became the unofficial theme of the 1903 World Series, when the words were changed from "Tessie, you know I love you madly" to "Honus, why do you hit so badly?"

Murray's popularity faded as public taste changed and recording technology advanced; the rise of the electric microphone in the mid-1920s allowed vocalists to sing softly, with more intimacy and expression, in a style often called crooning. Murray's "hammering" style, as he called it – essentially yelling the song into an acoustic recording horn – did not work in the electrical era, and he had to learn to soften his voice.

K-K-K-Katy
Performed by Billy Murray (Recorded in 1918)

You're a Grand Old Flag
Performed by Billy Murray (Recorded in 1906)

Are You from Dixie ('Cause I'm from Dixie Too)
Performed by Billy Murray (Recorded in 1916)

I've Been Floating Down the Old Green River
Performed by Billy Murray (Recorded in 1915)

Though his singing style was less in demand, he continued to find recording work. Some of the lower-budgeted recording companies were slow to convert to the new microphone technology and continued to record acoustically, which offered further opportunities for Murray's full-voiced singing. By the late 1920s and early 1930s, the music from his early days was considered nostalgic, and Murray was in demand again. He did voices for animated cartoons, especially Max Fleischer's popular "Bouncing Ball" sing-along cartoons and the Fleischer character Bimbo. He also did radio work. In 1929, Murray and Walter Scanlon provided the voices for the Fleischer short animated film Finding His Voice, produced by Western Electric.

Murray made his last recordings for Beacon Records on February 11, 1943, with Jewish dialect comedian Monroe Silver. He retired the next year to Freeport, Long Island, New York because of heart problems.

Variety estimated he made between 6,000 and 10,000 recordings in 45 years under a range of different pseudonyms, selling up to 300 million records, a record at the time.

He died at nearby Jones Beach of a heart attack in 1954 at the age of 77. Murray had married three times; the first two marriages ended in divorce. He was survived by his third wife, Madeleine, and is buried in the Cemetery of the Holy Rood in Westbury, New York.

== Selected song discography ==
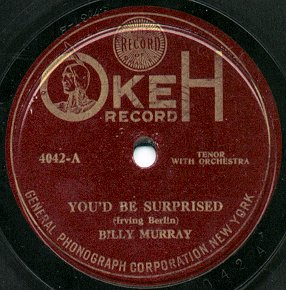
"You'd Be Surprised", on OkeH, 1919

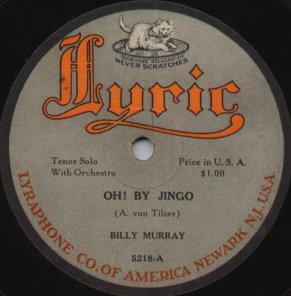
"Oh! By Jingo", on Lyric, 1919

- "Ain't It Funny What a Difference Just a Few Hours Make"
- "Alexander's Ragtime Band"
- "Always Leave Them Laughing When You Say Goodbye"
- "Any Little Girl, That's a Nice Little Girl, is the Right Little Girl For Me"
- "At the Moving Picture Ball"
- "Be My Little Baby Bumble Bee" with Ada Jones
- "Because I'm Married Now"
- "Blue Feather" with Ada Jones
- "Bon Bon Buddy"
- "Charley, My Boy"
- "Cheyenne"
- "Clap Hands! Here Comes Charley!"
- "College Life" (originally published and written by Hery Frantzen in 1905; Billy Murray's version was recorded in 1906)
- "Come Josephine in My Flying Machine" with Ada Jones
- "Cordelia Malone"
- "Cuddle up a Little Closer, Lovey Mine" with Ada Jones
- "Daddy, Come Home"
- "Dear Sing Sing"
- "Dixie" with Frank Stanley, Ada Jones
- "Don't Bring Lulu"
- "Everybody Works But Father"
- "Forty-five Minutes from Broadway"
- "Gasoline Gus And His Jitney Bus"
- "Give My Regards to Broadway"
- "Harrigan"
- "He'd Have to Get Under — Get Out and Get Under (to Fix Up His Automobile)"
- "He Goes to Church on Sunday"
- "He May Be Old, But He's Got Young Ideas"
- "Hello, Hawaii, How Are You?"
- "I'll See You in C-U-B-A"
- "I'm Afraid to Come Home in the Dark"
- "In My Merry Oldsmobile"
- "In the Good Old Summer Time"
- "In the Land of the Buffalo"
- "In the Shade of the Old Apple Tree"
- "It's a Long Way to Tipperary"
- "It's the Same Old Shillelagh"
- "It Takes the Irish to Beat the Dutch"
- "I've Been Floating Down the Old Green River"
- "I've Got My Captain Working for Me Now"
- "I've Got Rings On My Fingers"
- "I Want to Go Back to Michigan"
- "I Wonder Who's Kissing Her Now"
- "K-K-K-Katy"
- ”Low Bridge”
- "Oh! By Jingo"
- "Oh, You Beautiful Doll"
- "On Moonlight Bay"
- "On the 5:15"
- ¨If it wasn´t for you¨ with Ada Jones
- "On the Old Fall River Line" from 1913
- "Over There"
- "Play a Simple Melody with Elsie Baker
- "Pretty Baby"
- "Pride of the Prairie"
- "School Days" with Ada Jones
- "Shine On, Harvest Moon" with Ada Jones
- "Some Sunday Morning" with Ada Jones
- "Tessie"
- "Tipperary"
- "Under the Anheuser Bush"
- "When We Were Two Little Boys"
- "The Streets of New York (In Old New York)"
- "The Whistler and His Dog" (as one of two whistlers)
- "The Worst Is Yet to Come"
- "The Yankee Doodle Boy"
- "You'd Be Surprised"
- "The Grand Old Rag (Flag)"

== See also ==
- "Take Me Out to the Ball Game"
