= Pride of the Prairie =

"Pride Of The Prairie"
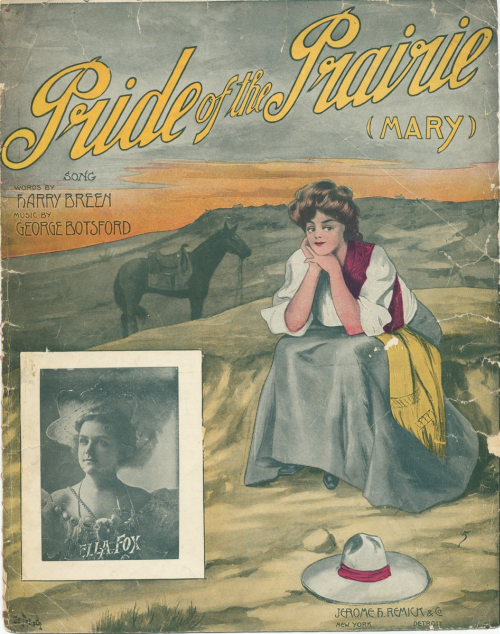
- Cover of sheet music, 1907.

Song
- Language: English
- Published: 1907
- Composer: George Botsford
- Lyricist: Henry J. Breen

"Pride Of The Prairie" is a popular song written in 1907 with music by George Botsford and lyrics by Henry J. Breen. The lyrics tell of a cowboy's love for Mary, the "Pride of the Prairie".

== Recordings ==
The song was first recorded by popular singer Billy Murray in 1908. Later recordings include versions by many country and folk acts, including Aaron Campbell's Mountaineers, Tex Owens, and Patsy Montana.

== Historical significance ==
Botsford wrote the music for the song while working for a publisher in New York, where he met Breen incidentally. It wound up launching his career as a composer, as its success resulted in securement of a contract with J. H. Remick & Co., for whom he later wrote 1908's Black and White Rag, which sold over 200,000 copies.

Like many Western-themed songs produced by Tin Pan Alley around the time, the song capitalized on the trends of a time when farming was beginning to take off in the Western United States. In addition, its release came one year after the introduction of the Ford Model T, and accessibility to long-distance travel spurred the advent and popularization of cowboy tourism. Sales reflected this popularity, as the sheet music sold over 300,000 copies. Early recordings of the song were not by country or folk singers, but mainstream East Coast singers such as Billy Murray.

Historian Jim Walsh called the song "one of the best of all cowboy songs".

== Lyrics ==
The lyrics to the chorus are:

Pride of the prairie, Mary my own,
Jump up beside me, ride to my home
My heart's been lassoed,
No more we'll roam,
Pride of the prairie, Mary.
(repeat)

== Bibliography ==
- Breen, Henry J. (w.); Botsford, George (m.). "Pride Of The Prairie" (Sheet music). Detroit: Jerome H. Remidck & Co. (1907).
