= When the Sun Goes Down in Romany: My Heart Goes Roaming Back to You =

1916 song written by Sam M. Lewis and Joe Young and composed by Bert Grant

Song
- Language: English
- Published: 1916
- Composer(s): Bert Grant
- Lyricist(s): Sam M. Lewis; Joe Young

"When the Sun Goes Down in Romany: My Heart Goes Roaming Back to You" is a World War I song written by Sam M. Lewis and Joe Young and composed by Bert Grant. This song was first published in 1916 by Waterson, Berlin & Snyder, Co. in New York City.

The sheet music can be found at the Pritzker Military Museum & Library.
