= I'll See You in C-U-B-A =

"I'll See You In C-U-B-A"
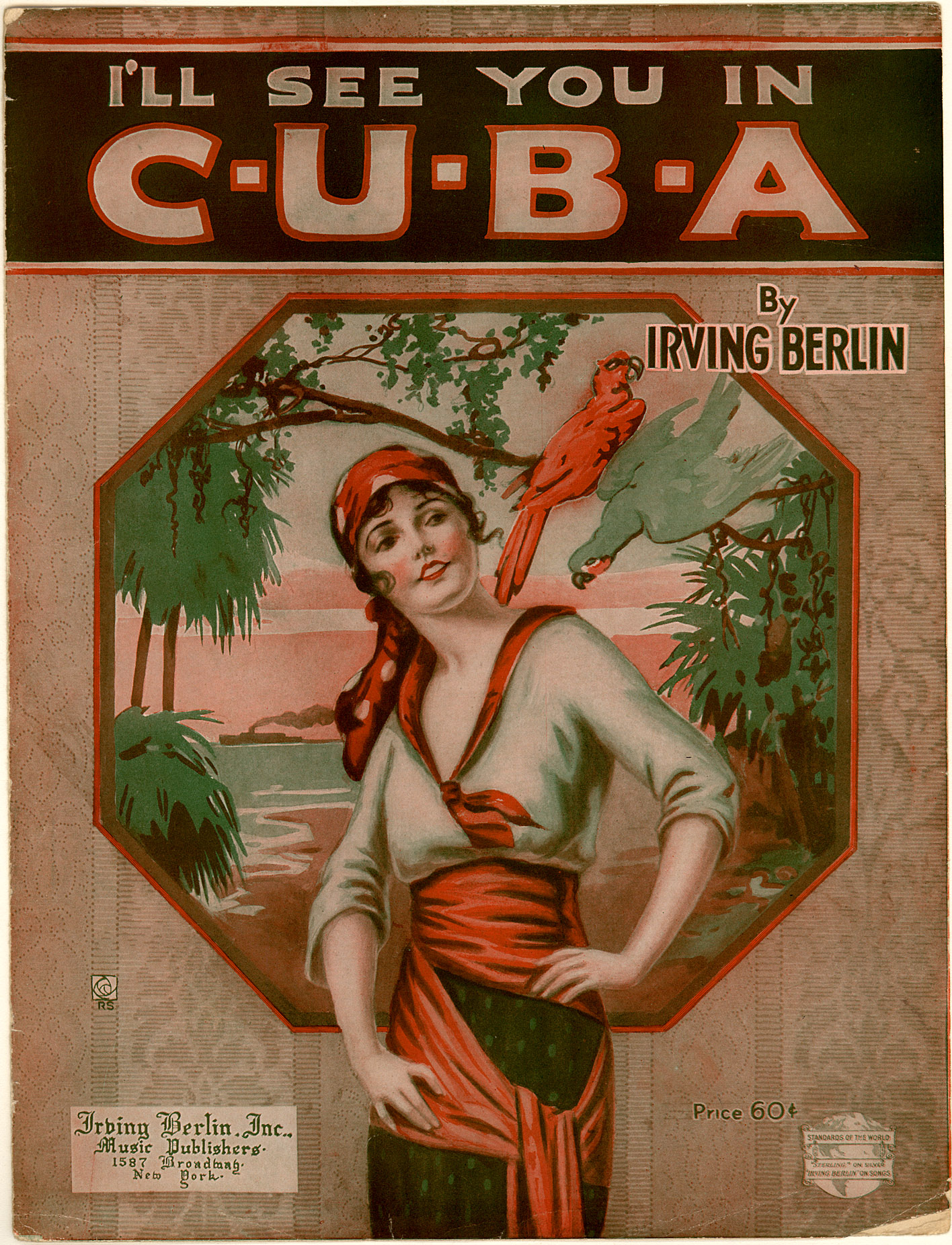
- Sheet music cover, 1920

Song
- Written: 1919
- Released: February 26, 1920
- Songwriter(s): Irving Berlin

"I'll See You in C-U-B-A" is a 1919 popular foxtrot Tin Pan Alley song written by Irving Berlin, for the musical revue The Greenwich Village Follies. The Follies first opened on July 15, 1919.

The music features a simple rhythm and melody without direct Cuban musical influences. Its lyrics are notable for expressing "comical disdain for prohibition's benefits to society" in response to the passing of the Eighteenth Amendment on January 16, 1919, and advertising Cuba as a tourist destination.

== Content ==
In the song, the singer persuades the audience to travel to Cuba "where wine is flowing", as a response to the 1920 prohibition of alcohol in the United States. It also epitomizes the friendly relations between Cuba and the United States, prior to the 1952 Cuban Revolution era. As a travel advertisement, the song reflects the early-20th-century status of Cuba as "America's playground", which is a label that many Cubans "would come to resent" in the decades afterward.

The University of Illinois has likened its content to other Tin Pan Alley songs including Jean Schwartz's "Sahara (We'll Soon Be Dry like You)" and Albert von Tilzer's "I've got the Alcoholic Blues", while America's Songs compared it to "You Don't Need the Wine to Have a Wonderful Time" written by Harry Akst and Howard E. Rogers for comedy singer Eddie Cantor.

=== Background ===
Prior to writing the song, Irving Berlin composed "There's a Girl in Havana" in 1911, with lyrics written by E. Ray Goetz. A year later, E. Ray Goetz's sister, Dorothy Goetz, married Irving Berlin, and they vacationed in Havana for their honeymoon. Although Dorothy caught typhoid fever while in Cuba and died five months afterward in New York, the trip was among Berlin's only memories of Dorothy. Music historian Timothy Storhoff has claimed that their Cuban honeymoon served as direct inspiration for "I'll See You in C-U-B-A".

== In popular culture ==
In January 1920, the song was recorded by pop vocalist Billy Murray under the Victor label. Bing Crosby and Trudy Erwin performed a duet of the song in October 1946, and Nat King Cole recorded the song on November 2, 1956. A performance of the song by the Austin Lounge Lizards also appears on the soundtrack of Michael Moore's documentary Sicko.

== Lyrics and sheet music ==
Both the music and lyrics were composed by Berlin c. 1919.

The sheet music was published in 1920 by Irving Berlin Inc., 1587 Broadway.

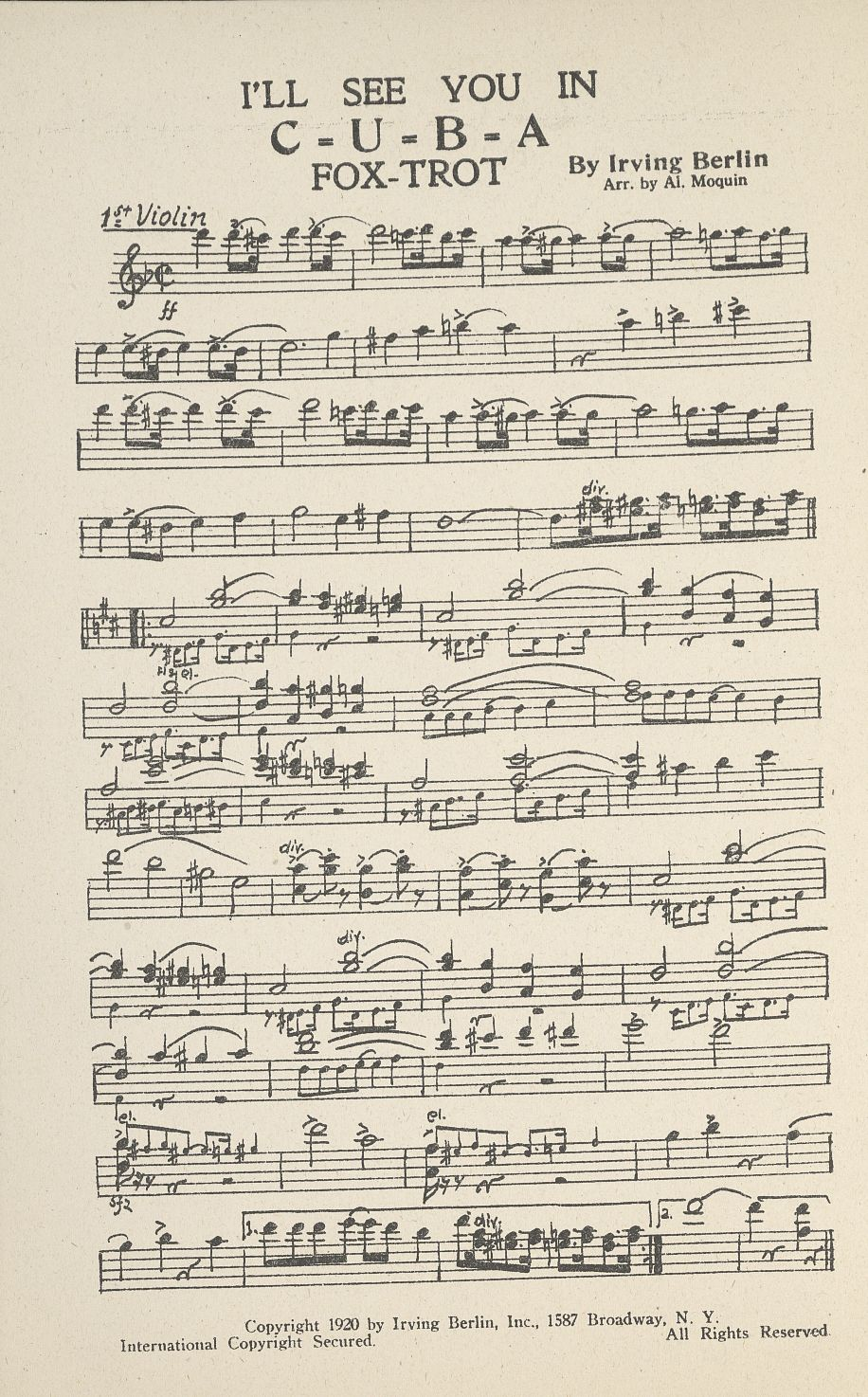

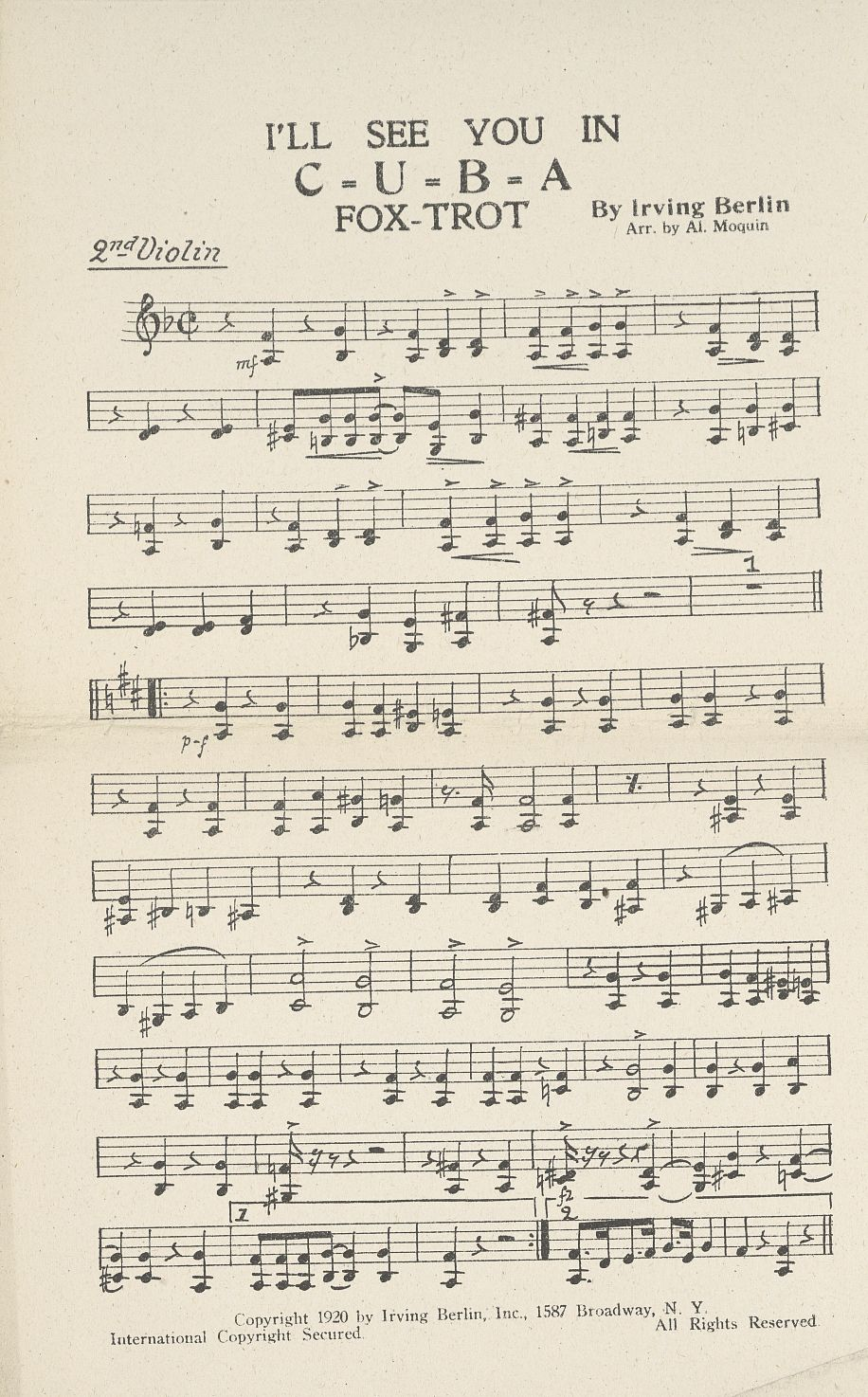

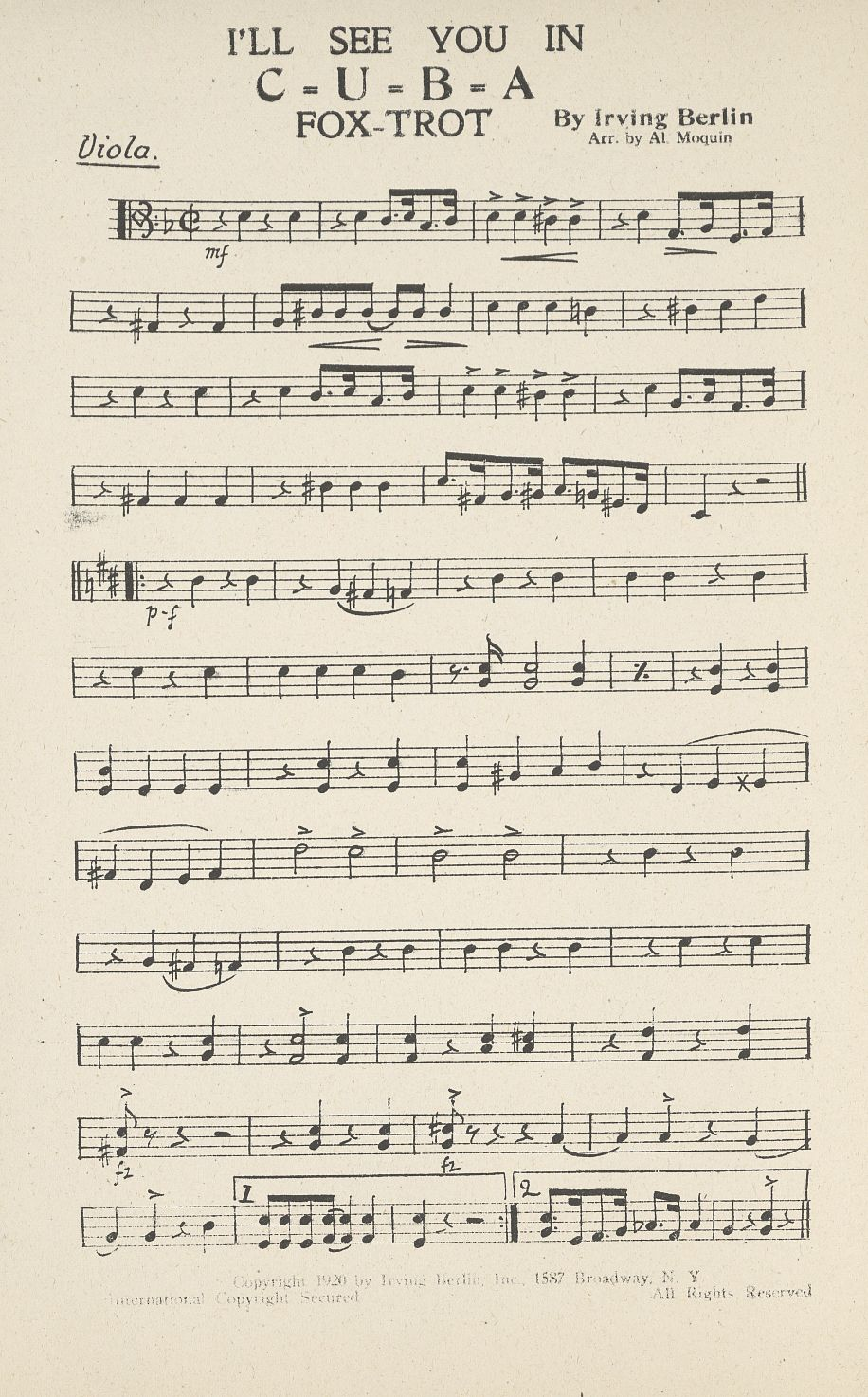

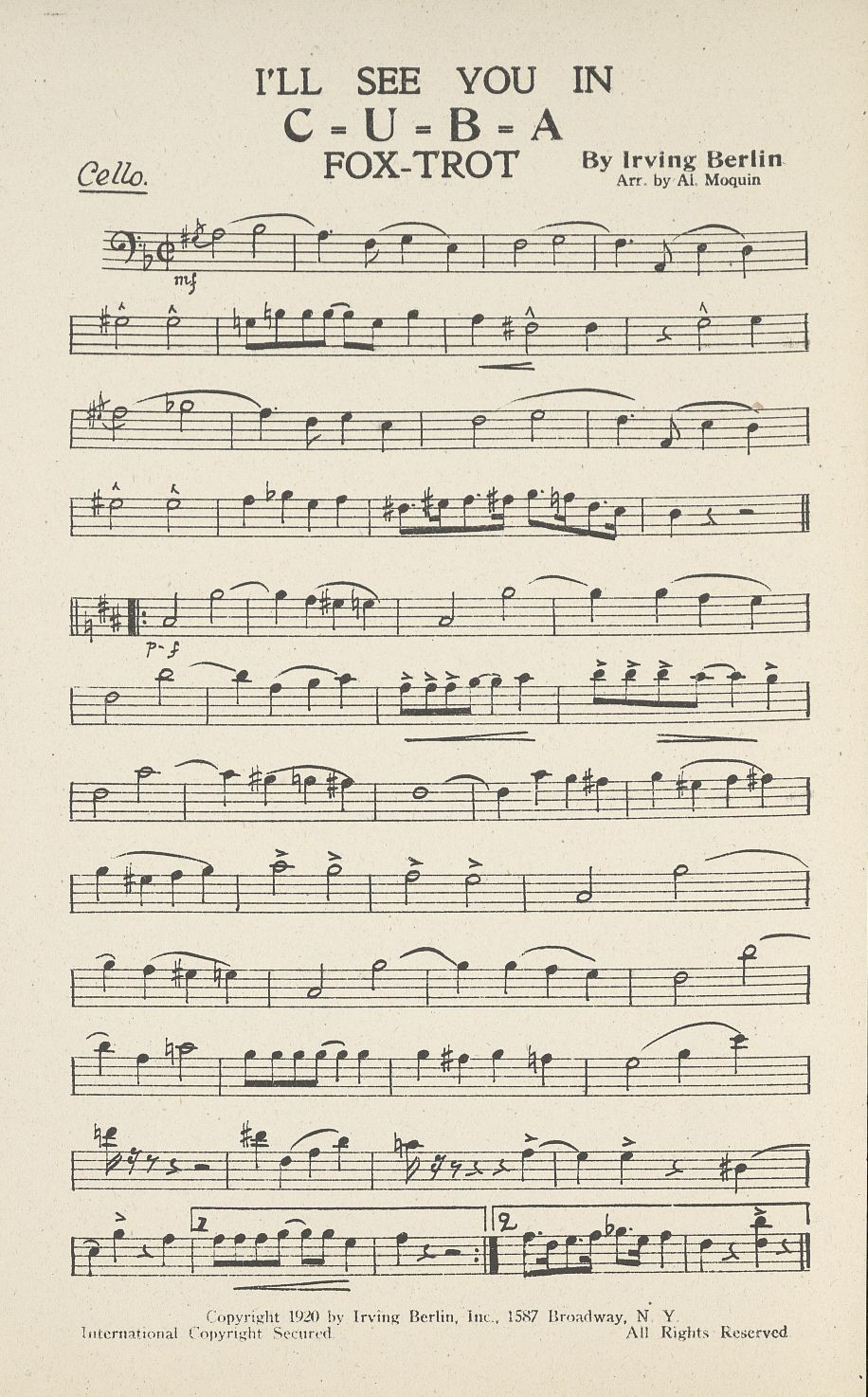

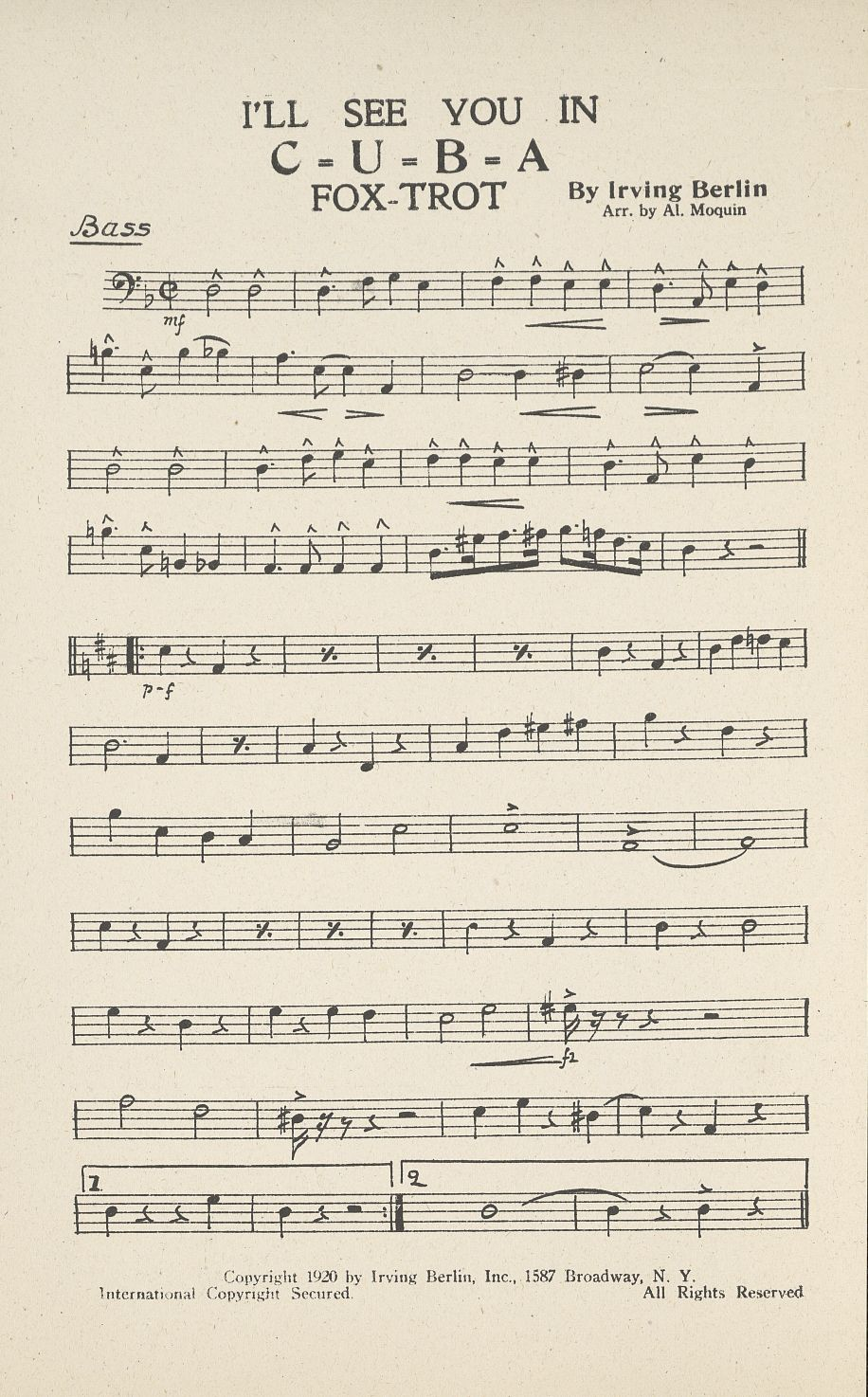

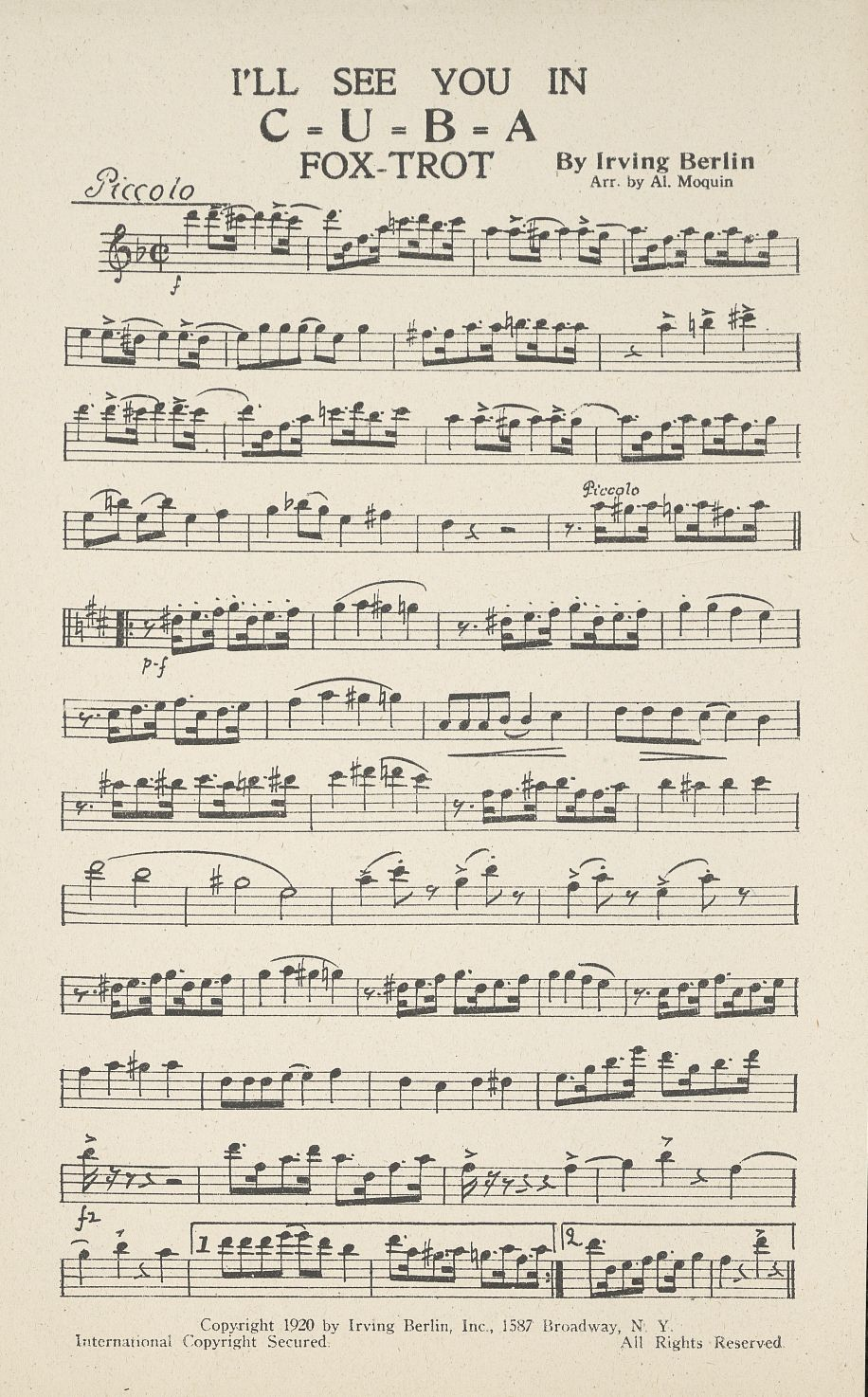

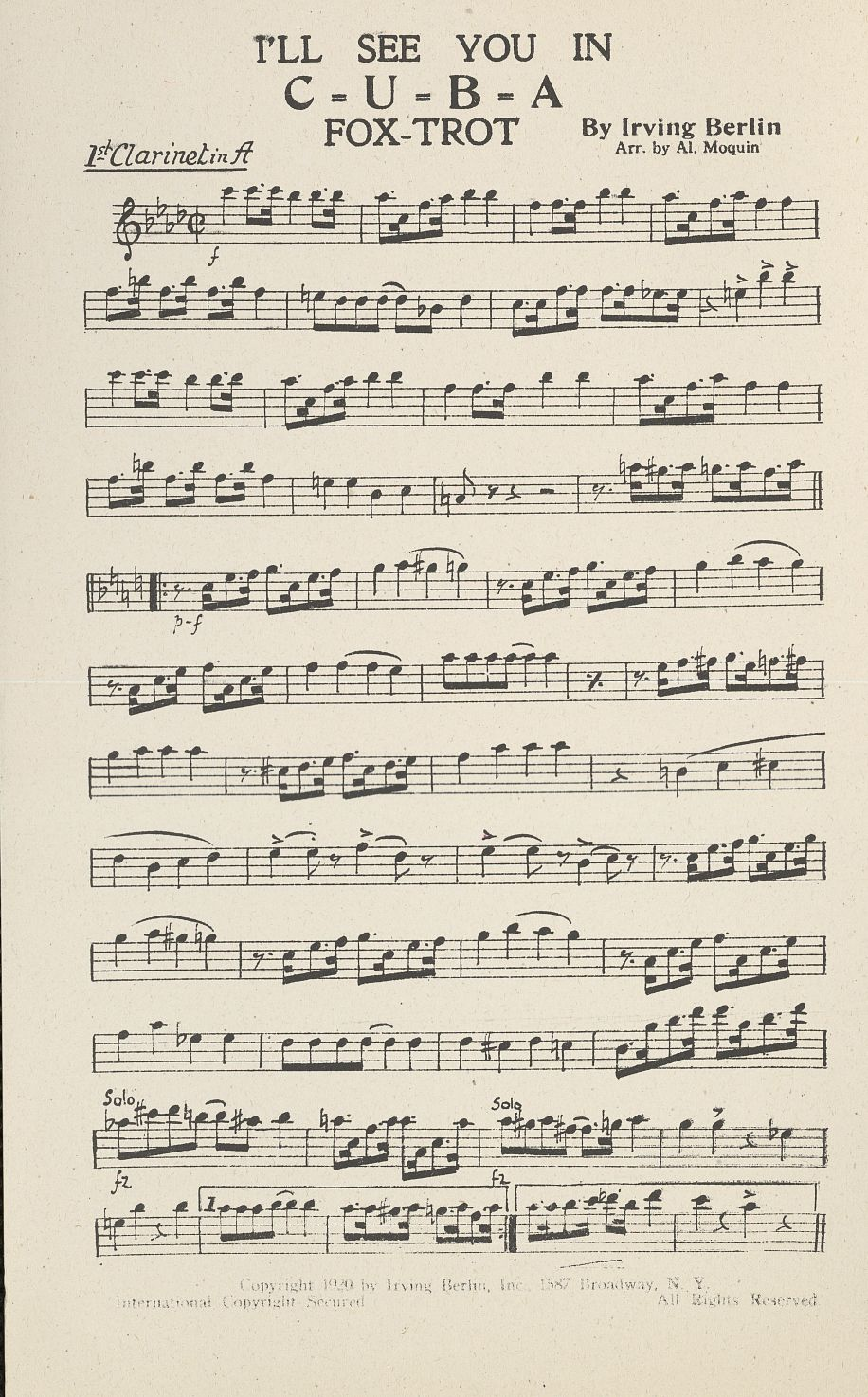

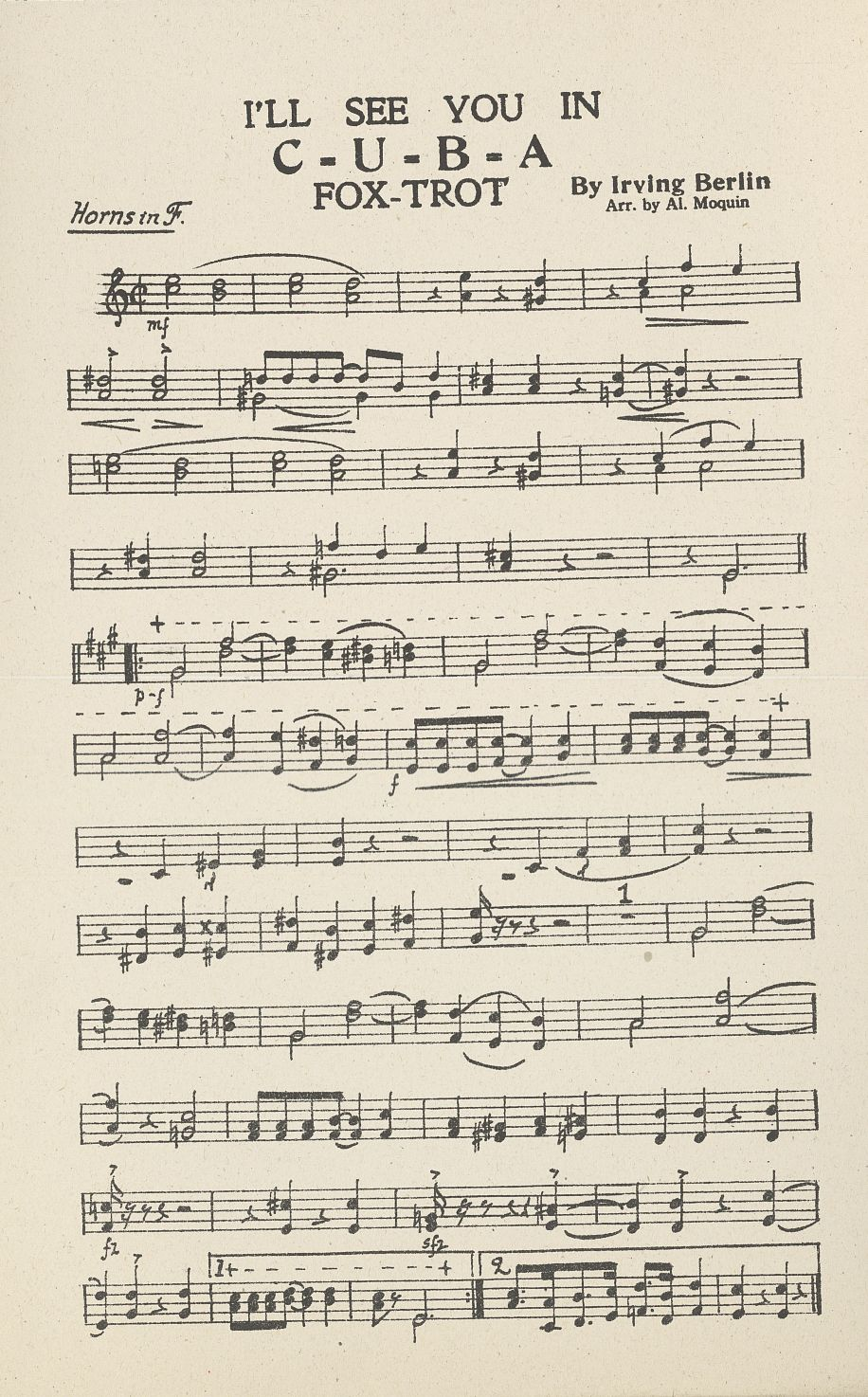

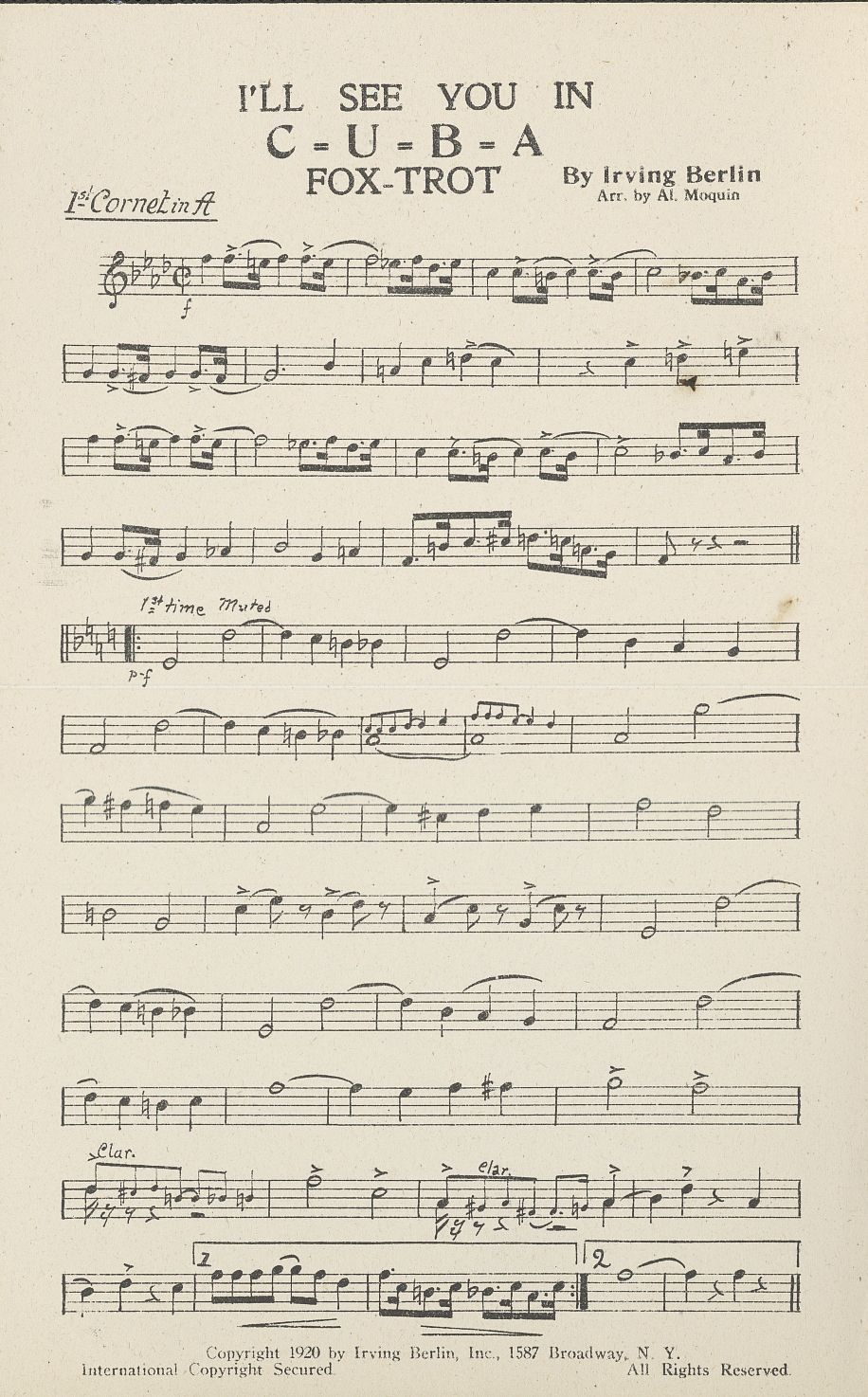

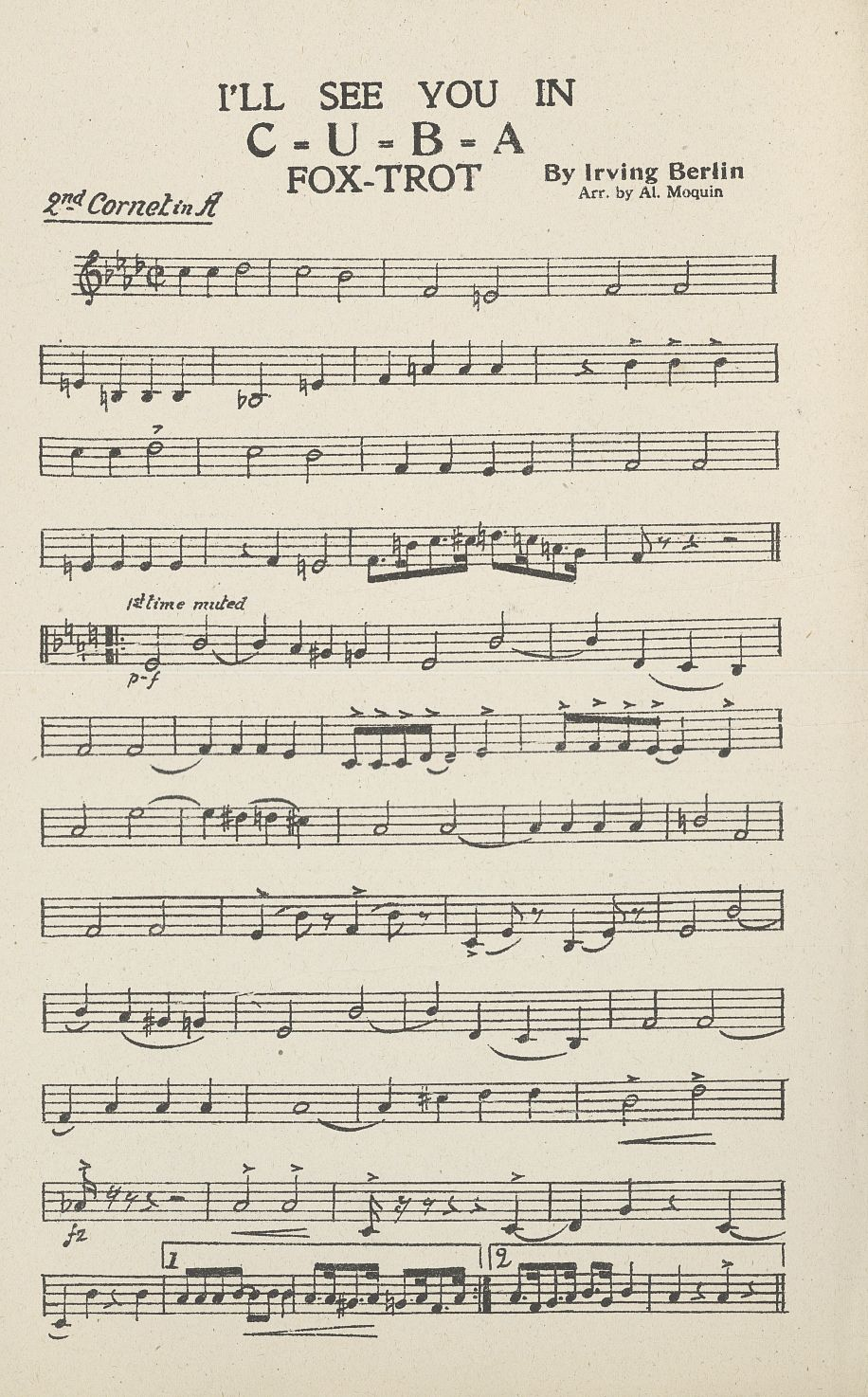

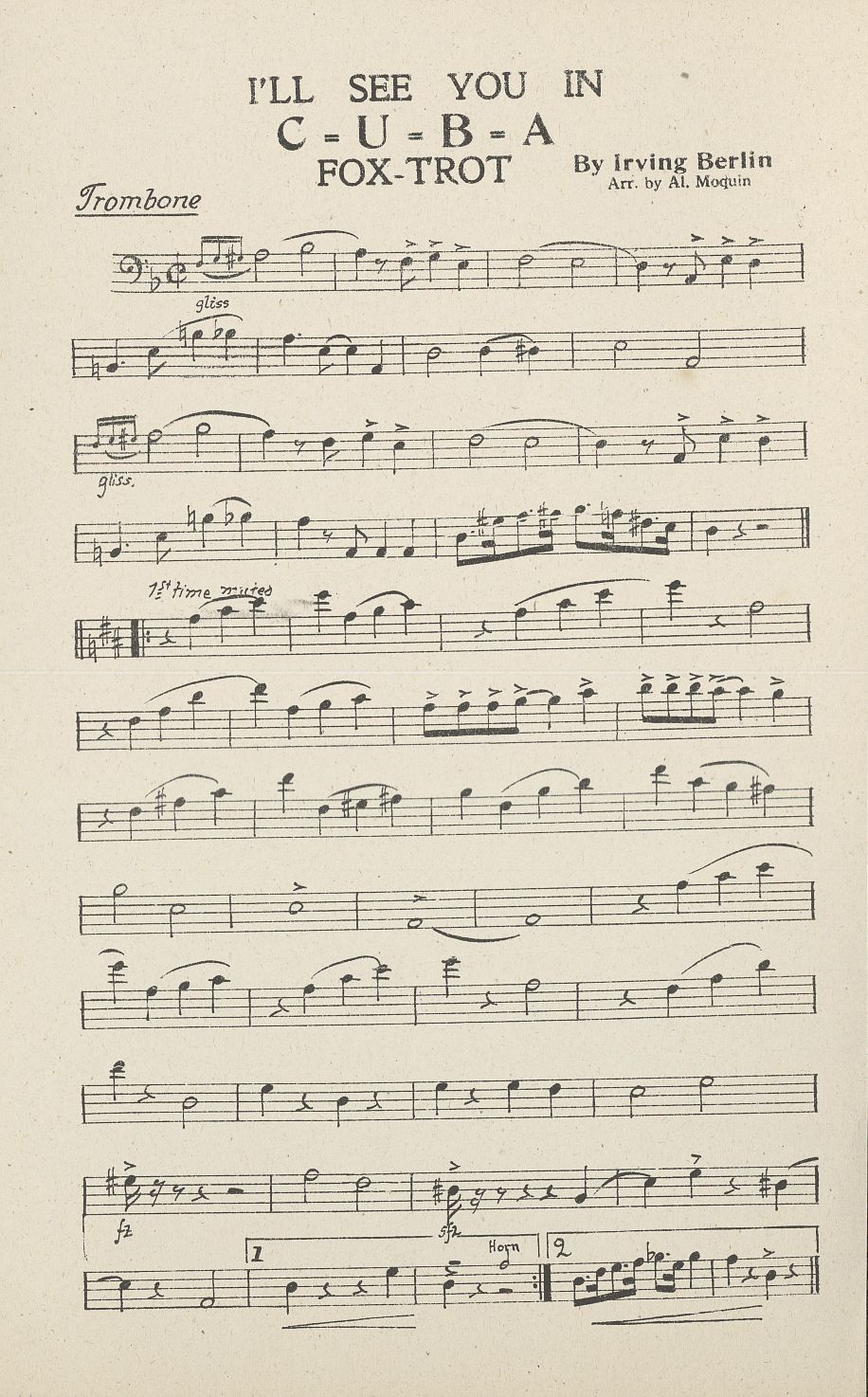

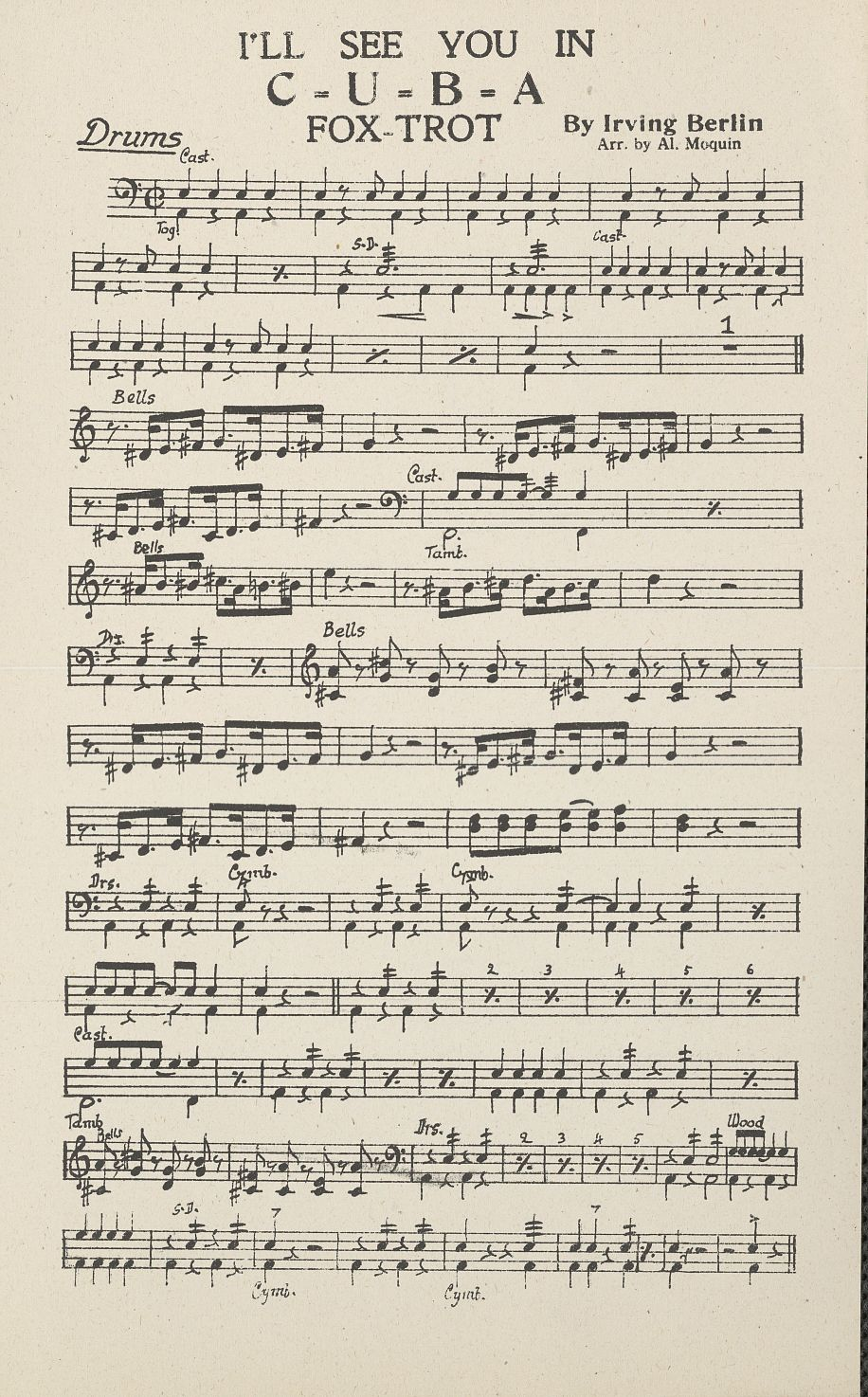

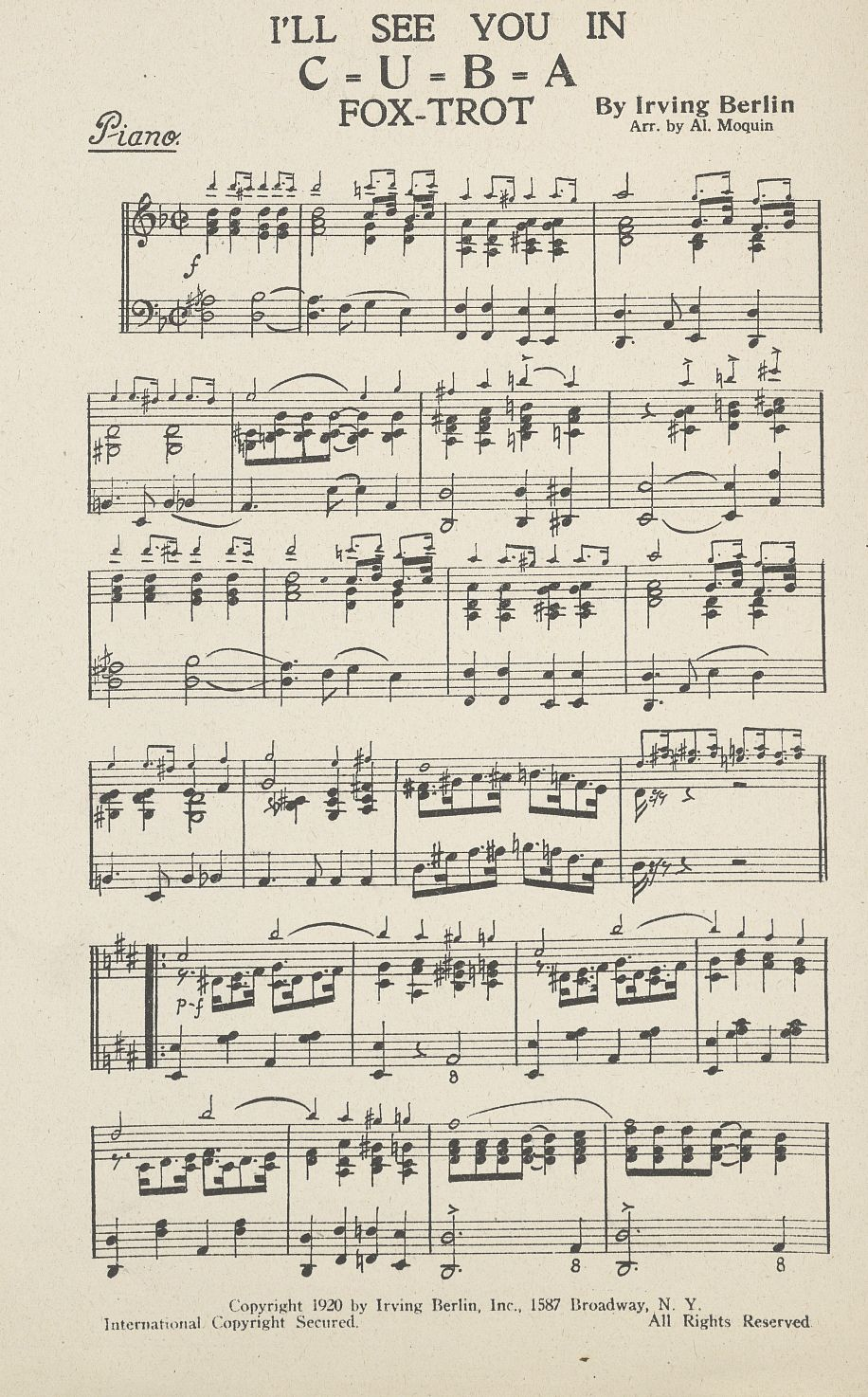

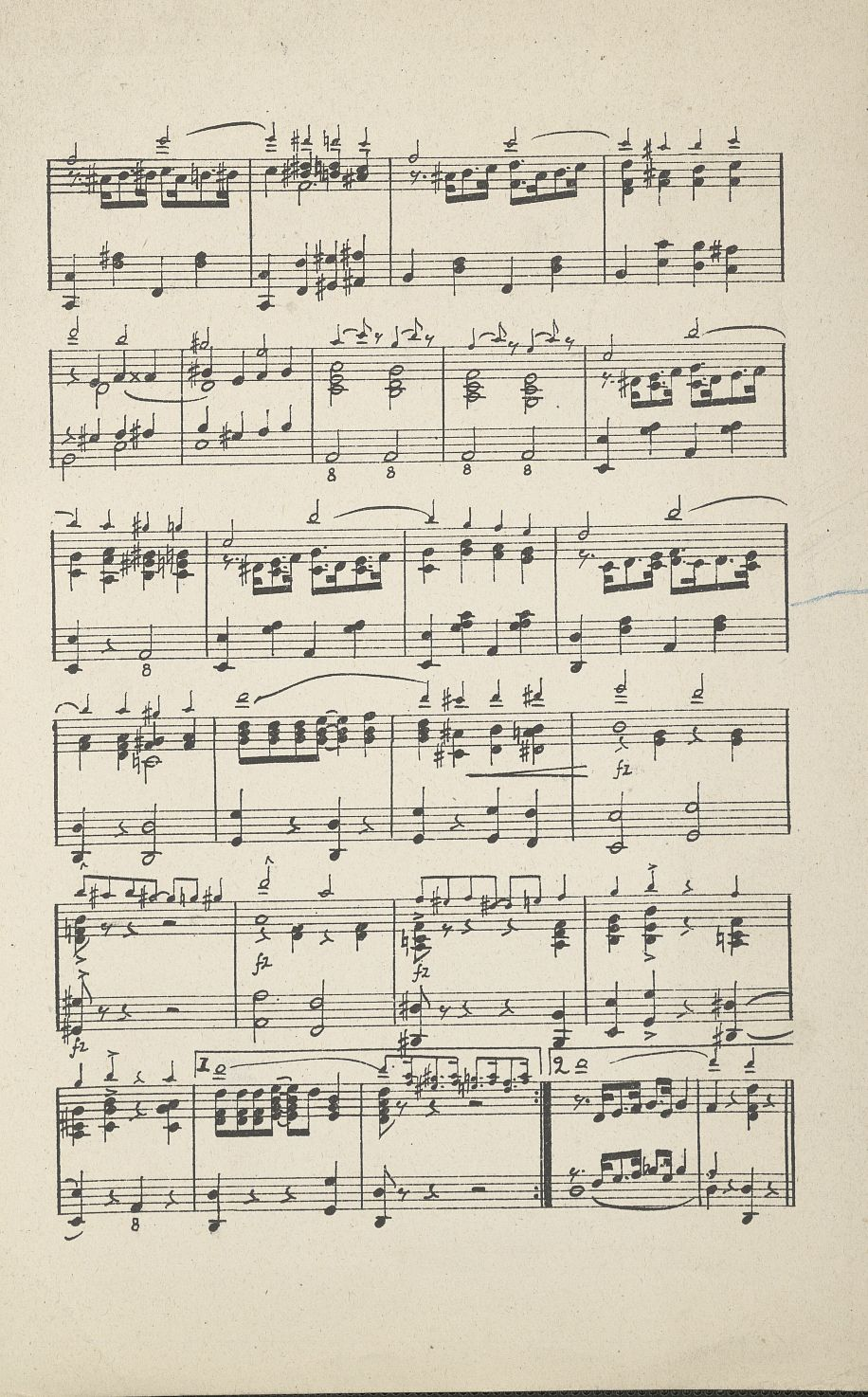

Not so far from here,
There's a very lively atmosphere,
Ev'rybody's going there this year;
And there's a reason:
The season opened last July,
Ever since the U.S.A. went dry,
Ev'rybody's going there and I'm going too
I'm on my way to
Cuba, there's where I'm going,
Cuba, there's where I'll stay.
Cuba, where wine is flowing
And where darkeyed Stellas
Light their fellers' panatellas,
Cuba, where all is happy,
Cuba, where all is gay;
Why don't you plan a wonderful trip,
to Havana? Hop on a ship,
And I'll see you in C-U-B-A.
Take a friend's advice,
Drinking in a cellar isn't nice,
Anybody who has got the price;
Should be a Cuban:
Have you been longing for the 'smile'
That you haven't had for quite a while,
If you have, then follow me and I'll show the way
Cuba, there's where I'm going,
Cuba, there's where I'll stay.
Cuba, where wine is flowing
And where darkeyed Stellas
Light their fellers' panatellas,
Cuba, where all is happy,
Cuba, where all is gay;
Why don't you plan a wonderful trip
to Havana? Hop on a ship,
And I'll see you in C-U-B-A.

== See also ==
- List of songs written by Irving Berlin
- Speakeasies, underground bars to which the song alludes
- Novelty music
