= Oh By Jingo! =

1919 novelty song by Albert Von Tilzer & Lew Brown

Single by Billy Murray
- B-side: "(instrumental version)"
- Published: 1919
- Released: 1919
- Genre: Novelty
- Label: Emerson
- Composer: Albert Von Tilzer
- Lyricist: Lew Brown

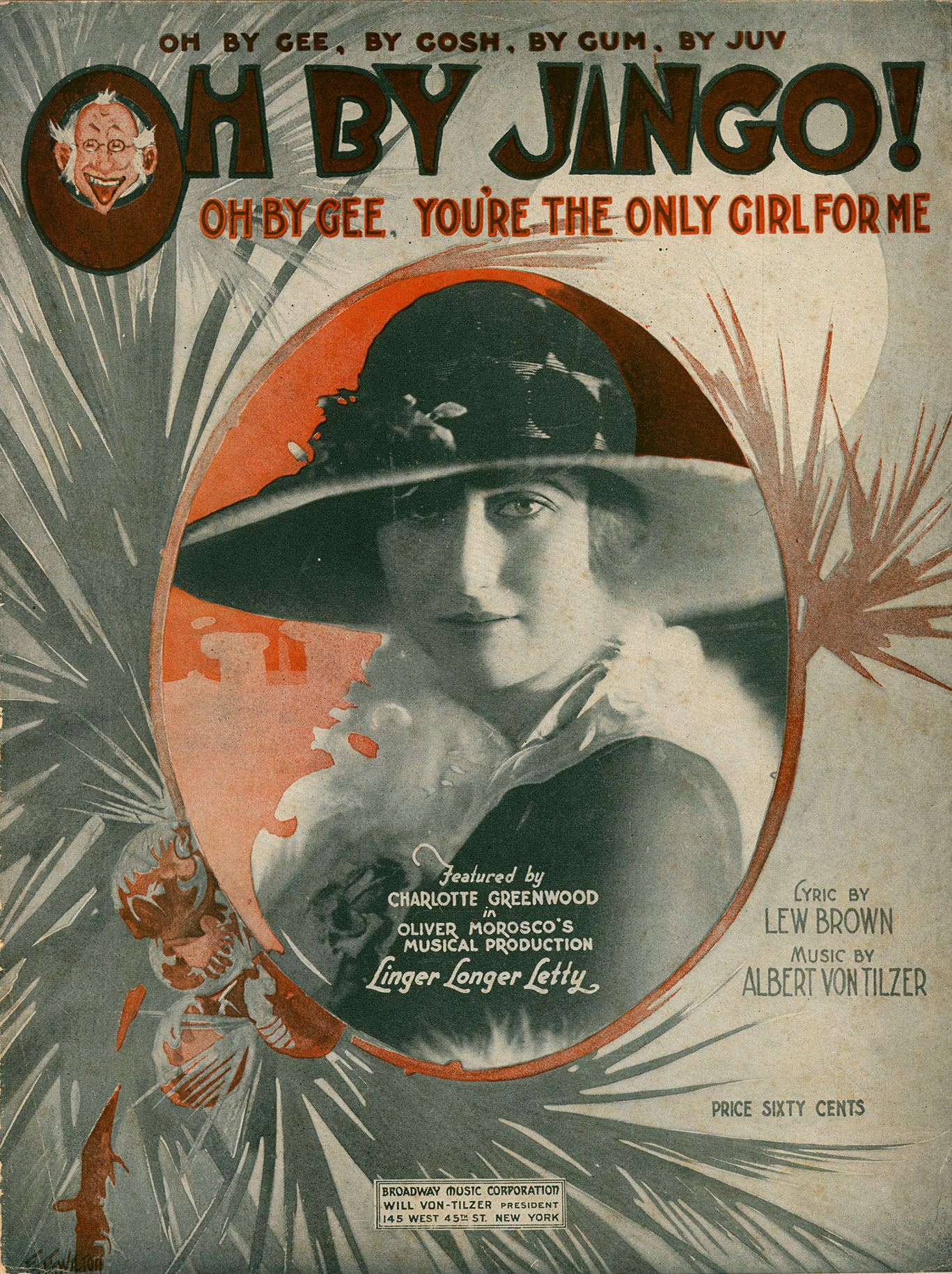
Sheet music cover with picture of Charlotte Greenwood (1919)

"Oh By Jingo!" played on the piano

"Oh By Jingo!" (also "Oh By Jingo! Oh By Gee You're The Only Girl For Me"), is a 1919 novelty song by Albert Von Tilzer with lyrics by Lew Brown. The song was featured in the Broadway show "Linger Longer Letty", and became one of the biggest Tin Pan Alley hits of the post-World War I era.

While the song lyrics say it is set in "the land of San Domingo", no geographic nor anthropological accuracy is found nor intended in the silly lyrics, set in a generic "exotic" and "primitive" location. The song was much imitated over the next decade.

The song appeared several times in film and television: it was performed by Betty Hutton in the film Incendiary Blonde (1945); by Debbie Reynolds and Bobby Van as a specialty number in the Esther Williams MGM vehicle, Skirts Ahoy!; sung in the I Love Lucy TV show (Season 4, ep. 2, "Mertz and Kurtz", October 11, 1954); and sung by Hugh Laurie and several other cast members in the television version of P. G. Wodehouse's Jeeves and Wooster (Season 4, ep. 5).

The 1970 song "After All" by David Bowie, from the album The Man Who Sold the World contains the repeated phrase 'Oh By Jingo' which is inspired by the song.
