= I'm Afraid to Come Home in the Dark =

1907 song performed by Billy Murray

I'm Afraid to Come Home in the Dark is popular song, written by Egbert Van Alstyne and Harry Williams in 1907, and made famous by Billy Murray. Today it is popular among collectors of cylinder recordings. Murray recorded the song on several record labels, including Edison Records in 1908. This version is now in the public domain.

On January 30, 1930, Fleischer Studios released a cartoon with this song through Paramount Pictures as part of their Screen Songs series, with Murray again.

In the season 4 episode of I Love Lucy titled "First Stop" (1955), part of the song is sung by Mr. Skinner (Olin Howland). In the season 4 episode of M*A*S*H titled "Mail Call...Again" (1975), Colonel Potter (Harry Morgan) sings part of the song while shaving.

== See also ==
- Billy Murray (singer)
- 1907 in music
- 1908 in music
