= In the Land of the Buffalo =

"In The Land Of The Buffalo"
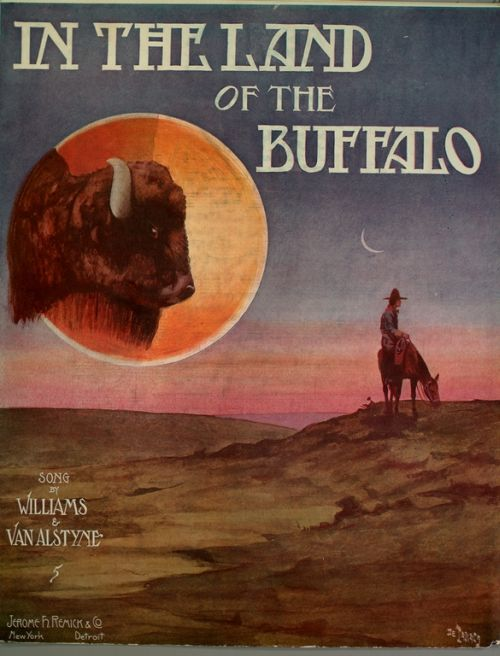
- Cover, sheet music, 1909

Song
- Language: English
- Published: 1907
- Composer: Egbert Van Alstyne
- Lyricist: Harry Williams

"In the Land of the Buffalo" is a popular song, first published in 1907. The chorus:

In the land of the Buffalo,
Where the Western breezes blow,
Where the goodnight kiss of the sunlight
Sets all the plains aglow.
It was there you discovered your Flo,
In the days of long ago.
But you never knew brother Lew loved her too,
In the land of the Buffalo.

It was recorded by many popular artists of the time, including Billy Murray on Edison Records. Billy Murray's version can also be found at several websites, as it has entered the public domain.

== See also ==
- 1907 in music
- Edison Records
