= I Want to Go Back to Michigan =

Song by Irving Berlin

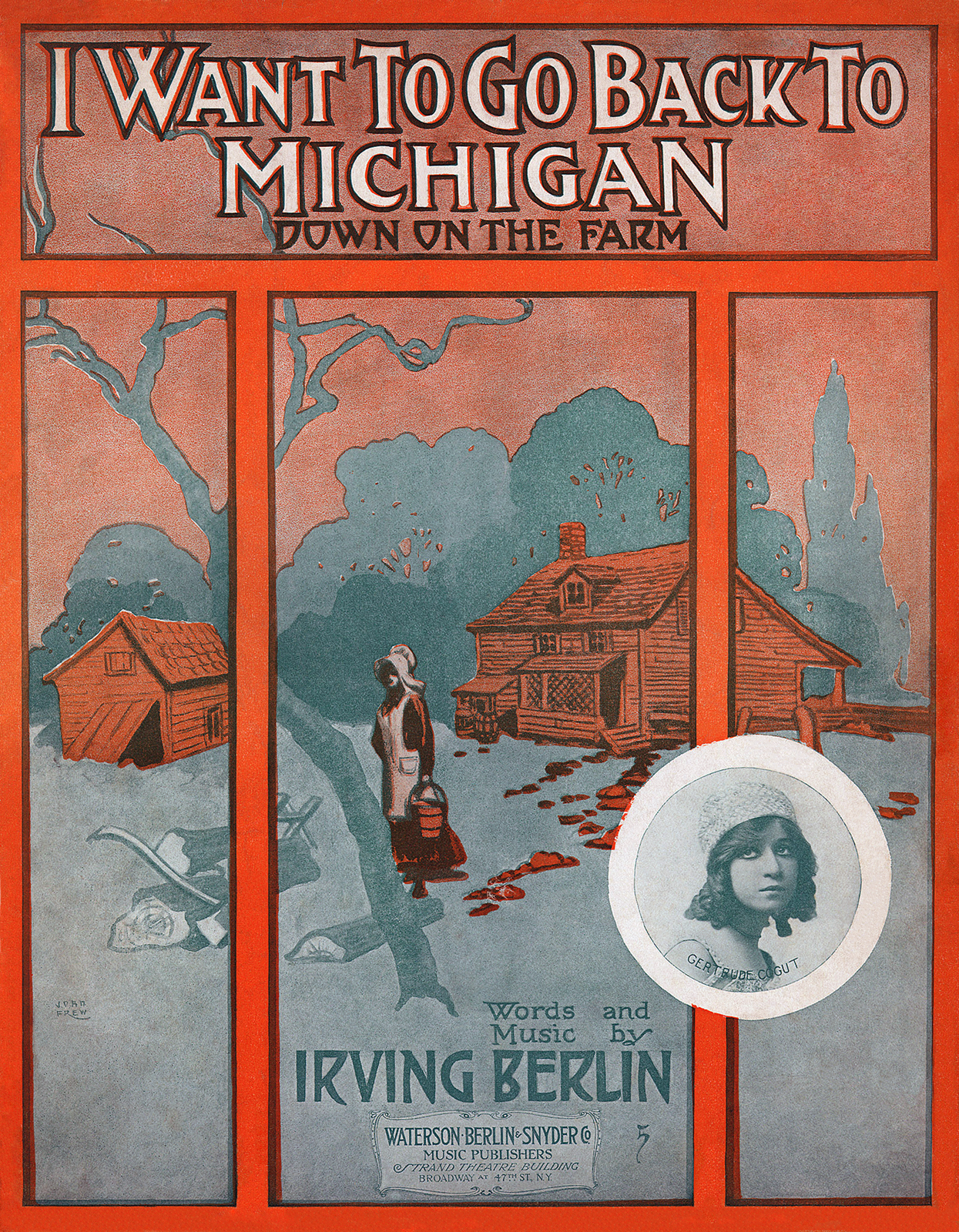
Cover page to the first edition printing.

"I Want to Go Back to Michigan" is a song by Irving Berlin composed in 1914. It was a moderate commercial success when it was first released with popular versions by Elida Morris and by Morton Harvey. Afterwards it became a staple in vaudeville. Its most famous performance was by Judy Garland in the film Easter Parade.

== Lyrics ==
The ballad's lyrics employ imagery of an idyllic rural childhood juxtaposed against less appealing city life, which was a theme among some popular songs during this period of rapid urban growth in the United States.

You can keep your cabarets
Where they turn nights into days.
I'd rather be where they go to bed at nine.
I've been gone for seven weeks
And I've lost my rosy cheeks.

I Want to Go Back to Michigan
Performed by Billy Murray for Edison Records in 1914.

== Composition ==
According to Charles Hamm in a biography of Irving Berlin, the songwriter composed "I Want to Go Back to Michigan" at a time when his ambitions were aiming past vaudeville toward musical theater and he was exercising new styles. The nostalgic reminiscence here, along with "Happy Little Country Girl" composed during the same period, was previously unknown in his work. Billy Murray, a popular singer during the period when the song was first composed, recorded it for Edison Records in 1914.

== Other recordings ==
- The Andrews Sisters recorded it on December 3, 1947 (Decca 9-24424)
- Burl Ives included the song in his album Burl Ives Sings Irving Berlin (1960).

== In film ==
The Avalon Boys performed an a cappella version of the song in the 1931 Laurel & Hardy film Pardon Us.

Judy Garland performed the song in the 1948 film Easter Parade, which was written around a mixture of ten older and eight newly composed Irving Berlin songs. Berlin's deal with MGM for the package of songs that included "I Want to Go Back to Michigan" was $500,000 plus a percentage of box office receipts, which was an unusually advantageous contract for a songwriter, and amounted to twenty percent of the film's total budget of $2.5 million. The film won the 1948 Academy Award for Best Musical Score.
