= Bert Grant =

Bert Grant (12 July 1878 – 9 May 1951 (Note: 21st century source such as this refers to Bert Grant's death as 10 May 1951.)) was an American composer, pianist, and charter member of the American Society of Composers, Authors, and Publishers.

== Biography ==
He was born in New York in 1878.

He worked for both Tin Pan Alley music publishers and Broadway theater companies.

He performed the first musical broadcast from Roselle Park, New Jersey.

== Selected works ==
- "Along the Rocky Road to Dublin"
- "Arrah Go On, I'm Gonna Go Back To Oregon"
- "Blue Bird"
- "If I Knock the 'L' out of Kelly"
- "In the Light of the Same Old Moon"
- "The Trolley Car Swing"
- "The Worst Is Yet to Come"
- "When the Angelus is Ringing"
- "When The Sun Goes Down In Romany: My Heart Goes Roaming Back To You"
- "When You're Away"

== Selected Broadway credits ==
- Cinderella on Broadway

== Awards ==
Seventeen of his songs are in the National Jukebox at the Library of Congress.
