= O'Brien Is Tryin' to Learn to Talk Hawaiian =

"O'Brien is Tryin' to Learn to Talk Hawaiian"
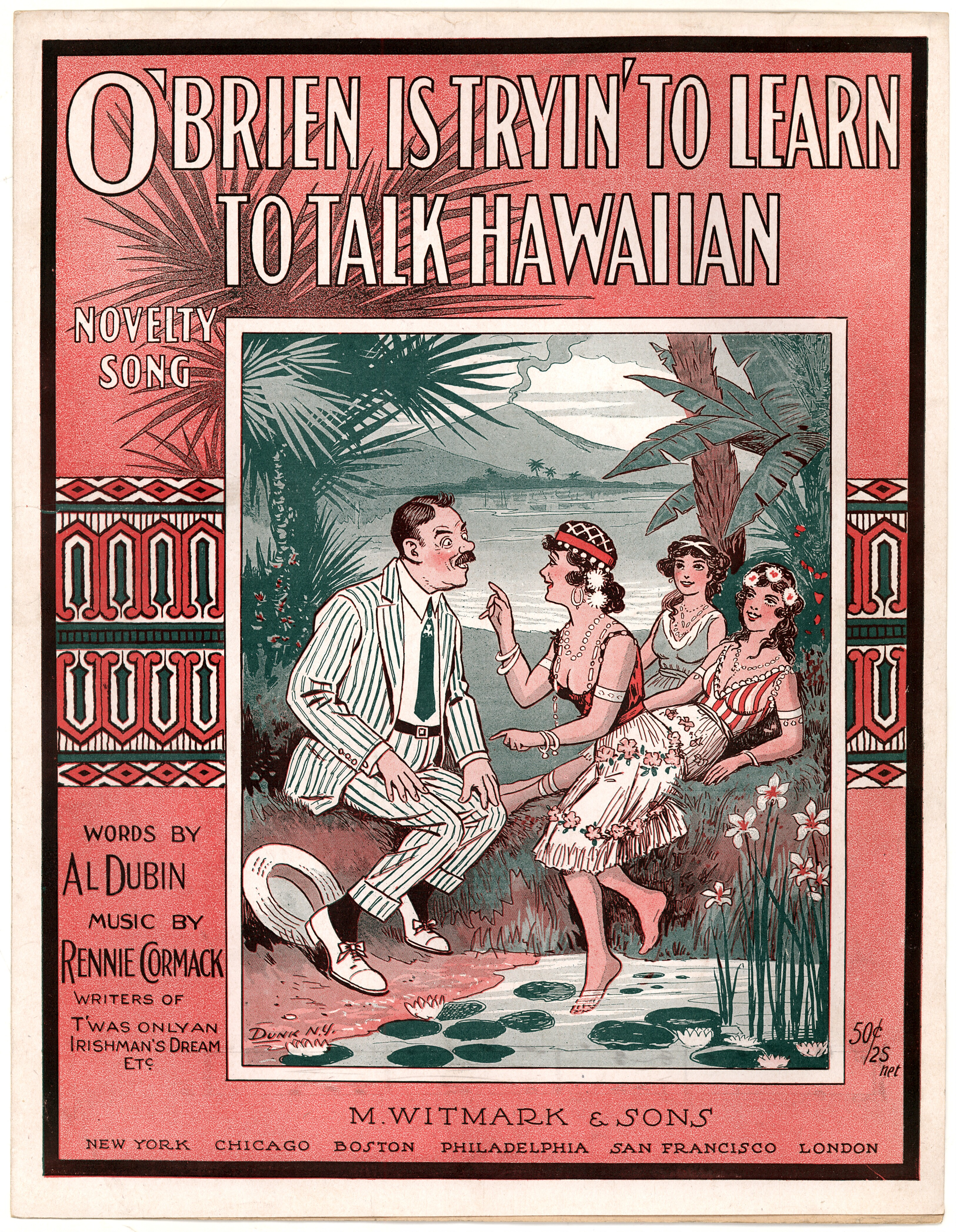
- Sheet music cover

Song
- Published: 1917
- Songwriters: Al Dubin, Rennie Cormack

"O'Brien is Tryin' to Learn to Talk Hawaiian" is a World War I era song written by Al Dubin and Rennie Cormack in 1916.

== Reception ==
Horace Wright's version of "O'Brien is Tryin' to Learn to Talk Hawaiian" peaked at #2 on the US song charts in January 1917. The next month, Ada Jones's version peaked at #9.

== Lyrics ==
O'Brien is tryin' to learn to talk Hawaiian
To his Honolulu Lou
He's sighin' and cryin'
And all the time he's tryin
Just to say "I love you true."
With his "Ar-rah Ya-ka Hu-la
Be-gor-ra Hick-I-Du-lah"
And his Irish "Ji-ji-boo."

Sure, O'Brien is tryin' to learn to talk Hawaiian
To his Honolulu Lou
He's sighin' and lyin' in Irish and Hawaiian
To his wife and Lulu, too.
While he writes a lot of Blarney
To Katie in Kilarney
And she thinks that he is true.

Sure, O'Brien is tryin' to learn to talk Hawaiian
To his Honolulu Lou
He's sighin' and cryin' and all the time he's tryin'
Just to say "I love you true."
He won Bridget, Kate, and Mary
By singin' "Tip-per-ar-y"
And he'll win his Lulu, too,

O'Brien is tryin' to learn to talk Hawaiian
To his Honolulu Lou-u-u-u.
