= Harilaos Perpessas =

Greek composer

Harilaos Perpessas (Greek: Χαρίλαος Περπέσσας) (10 May 1907 — 19 October 1995) was a Greek-German composer of the Postmodern period.

== Life and career ==
Born to Greek parents in Leipzig, he moved to Berlin to study with Schönberg but opposed the latter's compositional methods. More influential, as it turned out, was Berlin-based Nikos Skalkottas who urged Perpessas to emigrate to his parents' homeland, which he did at the age of twenty-seven. He was to remain in Greece for fourteen years, through World War II, and gradually achieved success there as a composer, partly helped by conductor Dimitri Mitropoulos who championed his works.

But in 1948 he moved decisively to the United States, settling in New York, where he enjoyed moderate success over a period of four decades and pursued a lifestyle of much seclusion. In 1992 he was transferred by friends to a residential home in Sharon, Massachusetts; there he died.

== Music ==
Perpessas is seen as one of the first Greek composers to have moved away from the school of Musical Nationalism, often being grouped with Mitropoulos and Skalkottas. His orchestral works display chromatic polyphony and wide-leaping melodic lines with dramatic climaxes which demonstrate influences from Debussy, Mahler, Ravel and Strauss. He often kept revising his works, withholding them from publication. One of them so treated, the Christus Symphony, which took its final form in 1950 for performances by the New York Philharmonic, was revived successfully in 2022 by the Frankfurt Radio Symphony Orchestra under Constantinos Carydis.

== Works ==
=== Orchestral ===
- Dionysos Dithyramben (before 1934)
- Prelude and Fugue in C (1935, rev. 1970s)
- Symphony No. 2 (1936–37), completed as Sym. `Christus', 1948–50
- Symphonic Variations on Beethoven's Eighth Symphony, 1953–60
- Orchestration of J.S. Bach: Die Kunst der Fuge (1953–56)

=== Other works ===
- Piano Sonata, (1928–32, destroyed)
- String Quartet (1928–32, destroyed)
- Restoration, tetralogy, 1963–73: The Song of the Concentration Camp [= Prelude and Fugue, 1935]
- The Opening of the Seventh Seal (Liberation) (Hippolytus: Philosophumena)
- Conjunction
- The Infinite Bliss

== Sources ==
- The New Grove Dictionary of Music and Musicians
- P.E. Gradenwitz: 'Requiem to a Forgotten Composer', The Athenian, no. 272 (1996), 16–18
- S.D. Heliadelis: 'Harilaos Perpessas, o agnostos Siatistinos klassikos synthetis ke philosophos' [Harilaos Perpessas, the unknown classical composer and philosopher from Siatista], Elymiaka [Salonica], no. 43 (1999), 93–110
