= Anastazy Wilhelm Dreszer =

Polish pianist, composer and educator

Anastazy Wilhelm Dreszer (April 28, 1845 – June 2, 1907) was a Polish pianist, composer, and educator.

Dreszer was born in Kalisz, then in the Russian Empire. After studying at the conservatory in Dresden with Krebs, Döring, and Früh, Dreszer moved to Leipzig then Halle. He taught singing at a school he founded in 1868. He composed two symphonies and various pieces for piano. He died, aged 62, in Halle.
