= Tipperary (song) =

"Tipperary" is the name of an Irish-oriented love song written in 1907 by Leo Curley, James M. Fulton and J. Fred Helf, and was performed by early recording star Billy Murray.

The full lyrics can be found at and .

Chorus

Faith, it's me that's nearly crazy
From me Tipperary daisy
All the day me heart's "un-aisy" [uneasy]
Sure, the thing I find
That's on me mind
Is the darlin' girl I left behind
Far off in dear old Tipperary.

The term "ferninst" which appears in the second verse is an old-fashioned expression meaning "beside" (as in "she sat ferninst me").

== In popular culture ==
The song is referenced by name in the 1917 song O'Brien is Tryin to Learn to Talk Hawaiian, which was written and composed by Al Dubin and Rennie Cormack in 1917.
