= Black and White Rag =

Ragtime instrumental music

"Black And White Rag"
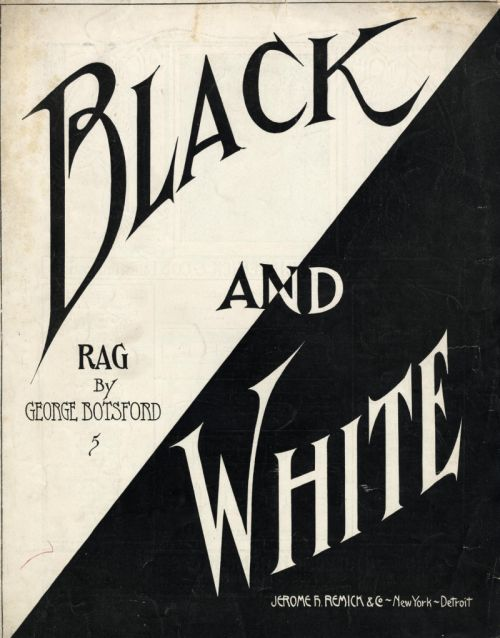
- Sheet music cover, 1908

Song
- Published: 1908
- Genre: Ragtime
- Songwriter: George Botsford

The "Black and White Rag" is a 1908 ragtime composition by George Botsford.

The song was recorded widely for both the phonograph and player piano, and was the third ragtime composition to sell over one million copies of sheet music. Early recordings were typically by bands; the first recording was performed by the American Symphony Orchestra for an Edison cylinder release.^{[a]} The first known piano recording of the piece was by Albert Benzler, recorded on Lakeside/U.S.Everlasting Cylinder #380 in June 1911.^{[a]} This recording is somewhat rare (Lakeside/U.S.Everlasting cylinders, though molded celluloid on a wax/fiber core, were made in small batches).

Pianist Wally Rose revitalized interest in the song with his 1941 recording, leading to one of the best-known versions: a 1952 recording by Trinidadian pianist Winifred Atwell, which helped her to establish an international profile. Originally the B-side of another composition, "Cross Hands Boogie", "Black and White Rag" was championed by the popular disc jockey Jack Jackson, and started a craze for Atwell's honky-tonk style of playing. The recording became a million selling gold record, and in the United Kingdom was later used as the theme tune for the long-running BBC2 television snooker tournament, Pot Black.

"Black and White" Rag was also later arranged for use as the music in the 1985 BBC Computer game Repton and some of its sequels.

The piece has also become a fiddle standard since as early as the 1930s, with recordings by musicians such as Johnny Gimble and Benny Thomasson.

== Notes ==
^{a} The first recording (and, additionally, first piano recording) is actually a part of "Fun at the Music Counter", a vaudeville skit recorded by Len Spencer; however this recording is arranged and not a complete musical recording of the song.

== Links ==
- The first known piano recording mentioned above can be heard here. http://cylinders.library.ucsb.edu/search.php?queryType=%40attr+1%3D1020&num=1&start=1&query=cylinder14960
