= Sylvio Lazzari =

French composer

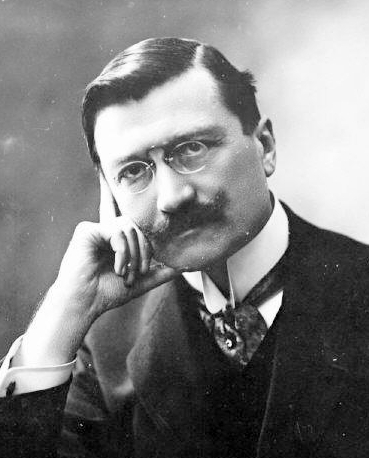
Sylvio Lazzari

Sylvio Lazzari (born Josef Fortunat Silvester Lazzari; 30 December 1857 – 10 June 1944) was a French composer of Austrian and Italian origin.

== Life ==
Born in Bolzano – then part of the Austro-Hungarian Empire – Lazzari came to Paris in 1882 after studying law in Austria. At the Paris Conservatory, he studied under Ernest Guiraud and César Franck. Encouraged by Ernest Chausson and Franck, Lazzari settled permanently in France and obtained French citizenship in 1896. He held several official positions in Paris, including president of the Wagner Society (from 1894) and choirmaster at the Opéra de Monte-Carlo. Because of dwindling eyesight, he later focused on composition only.

Lazzari's use of cyclic structures was indebted to Franck; he was also heavily influenced by Wagner (especially in his operas) and the impressionists. His best-known opera, La Lépreuse (first performed in 1912), was highly praised for its musical content, but frequently criticised for its naturalistic libretto. Three of his operas, including La Lépreuse, are inspired by Brittany, with Breton plots, also using Breton folksongs as local colour.

Very few of his compositions have been performed since his death, but some of his chamber music is occasionally revived. Lazzari died in Suresnes, near Paris.

== Works ==
=== Orchestra ===
- Marche pour une fête joyeuse (1903)
- Effet de Nuit (1904)
- Concertstück, Op. 18, piano and orchestra (1887, rev. 1894)
- Symphony in E-flat major (1907)
- Rapsodie, for violin and orchestra (1922)
- Suite in F major, Op. 23 (1922)
- Faust (incidental music, after Goethe) (1925)
- Au bois de Misère (1925)

=== Salon orchestra ===
- Perdu en mer (1926)
- Escualdune (Visions basques) (1927)
- Fête bretonne (1927)
- La Chanson du moulin (1928)
- Cortège nocturne (1929)

=== Chamber music ===
- Piano trio in G minor, Op. 13 (1889)
- String Quartet in A minor, Op. 17a (1888)
- Octet in F major, Op. 20, for flute, oboe, clarinet, English horn, 2 bassoons, 2 horns (1889)
- Violin Sonata in E major, Op. 24 (1894)
- Barcarolle, for cello and piano (1912)
- Scherzo, for violin and piano (1931)

=== Piano ===
- Valse brillante, Op. 4 (1884)
- Valses caractéristiques (1888)
- Suite, Op. 14 (1891)
- 3 Pièces, Op. 16 (1892)
- 2 Miniatures (1895)
- Petite esquisse (1903)
- Rapsodie hongroise, 4 hands (1903)
- Romanzetta (1923)
- Cordace (Danse grecque)(1925)

=== Orchestral songs ===
- 2 Poèmes (M. Dumont, P. Verlaine), Op. 30 (1901) (S. Mallarmé, 1903)
- Le Cavalier d'Olmedo (after L. de Vega) (1918)
- Le Nouveau Christ (H. Bataille) (1918), baritone
- La Fontaine de pitié (Bataille) (1920)

=== Songs ===
- More than 50 songs, among others:
- Vieux motif (L. B.) (1884)
- L'Amour d'après Ninette (G. Richard) (1887)
- À l'absente (P. Verlaine, J. Lahor, anon.), 6 songs (1892)
- L'Oiseau; Au printemps; La Jeune fille et la rose (Lazzari), 4 voices (1893)
- 3 Mélodies (P. Verlaine, L. Bowitsch, L. Benedite), Op. 19 (1894)
- L'Automne (A. de Lamartine), 3 voices, piano ad lib (1894)
- 3 Duos (Lazzari), Op. 21, Soprano, Baritone (1894)
- 2 Poèmes (M. Dumont, P. Verlaine), Op. 30 (1901)
- 3 Poésies d'E. Blémont d'après H. Heine (1906)
- Le Cavalier d'Olmedo (after L. de Vega) (1918)
- Le Nouveau Christ (H. Bataille) (1918)
- La Fontaine de pitié (Bataille) (1920)

=== Operas ===
- Armor (Ernest Jaubert), 3 acts (1896), first performed in Prague, 7 November 1898
- La Lépreuse, subt. tragédie légendaire (Henry Bataille), 3 acts (1896), first performed in Paris, 7 February 1912
- Melaenis (Georges Spitzmüller), 5 acts (1907), first performed in Mühlhausen, 25 March 1927
- Le Sauteriot (Henri Pierre Roché, Martial Périer, after E. von Keyserling), 3 acts (1915), first performed in Chicago, 19 January 1918
- La Tour de feu (Lazzari), 3 acts (1925), first performed in Paris, 28 January 1928

== Bibliography ==
- Don Randel (ed.): The Harvard Biographical Dictionary of Music (Harvard, 1996), p. 489.
- Sebastian Werr: "Lazzari, Sylvio", in: Die Musik in Geschichte und Gegenwart (MGG), biographical part vol. 10 (Kassel: Bärenreiter & Stuttgart: Metzler, 2003), 1380–1381.
