= George Botsford =

American composer (1874–1949)

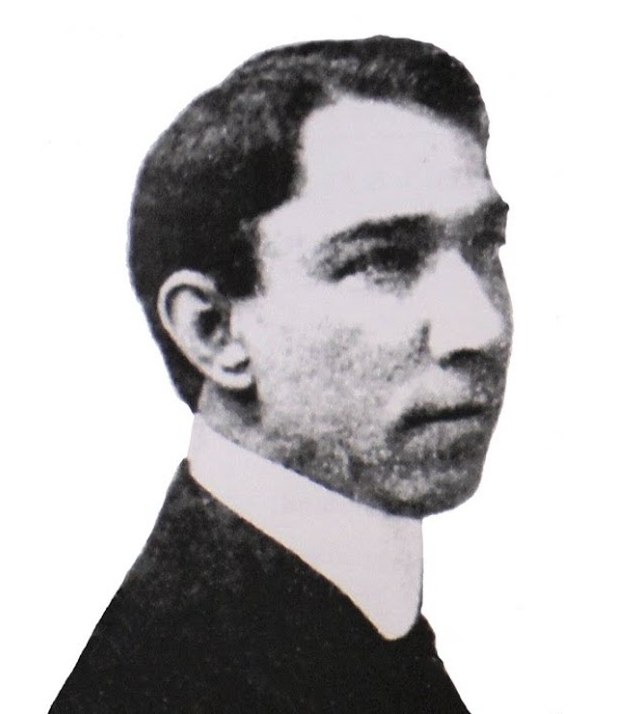
- Botsford in 1911

Background information
- Born: February 24, 1874; Sioux Falls, South Dakota, U.S.
- Died: February 1, 1949 (aged 74) New York City, New York, U.S.
- Genres: Ragtime
- Occupation: Composer

George Botsford (February 24, 1874 – February 1, 1949) was an American composer of ragtime and other forms of music.

== Early life and education ==
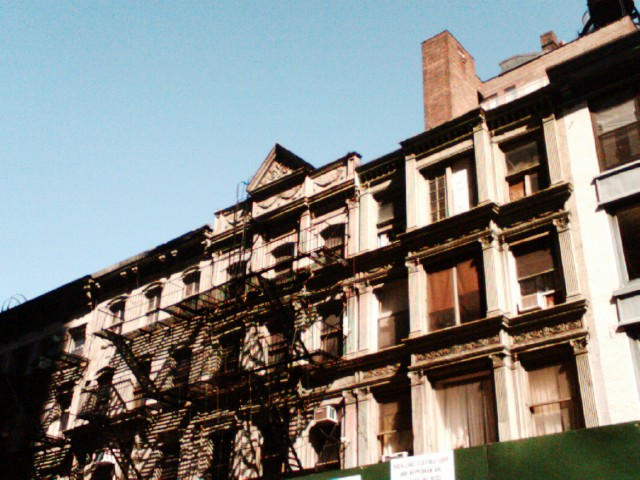
Buildings that housed sheet music publishers on Tin Pan Alley

Botsford was born in Sioux Falls, Dakota Territory. He grew up mostly in Clermont, Iowa. Botsford married singer Della Mae Wilson, and, in 1900, they began touring with the Hoyle Stock Company troupe. An ad promoting Botsford and his wife as musicians appeared in the New York Clipper in 1901, which may indicate the first time that Botsford visited New York City.

== Career ==
Botsford's first copyrighted number was "The Katy Flyer", published in 1899 in Centerville, Iowa. Other early numbers followed themes of relaxation and wide open space, with "Dance of the Water Nymphs", which was sold as Hawaiian mood music, and Western-themed "In Dear Old Arizona" and "Pride of the Prairie". This would change when Botsford moved to New York City, where he joined an assortment of Tin Pan Alley composers and began writing ragtime almost exclusively.

Botsford secured his first songwriting contract with New York's J. H. Remick & Co. after selling them "Pride of the Prairie". It was while on that contract that he published "Black and White Rag", which stands as perhaps the most known work of his career. He was put in charge of vocal arrangements for Remick's "harmony & quartet" division in 1910.

Botsford was a founding member of ASCAP in 1914. From 1914 to 1915, he experimented with miniature opera intended to be sung by three or four people, but the idea never gained momentum.

== Later life and death ==
By the 1920s, Botsford had largely stopped composing, and mostly made his living through organizing vaudeville performances. He produced a handful of musical shows for stage and radio. His last known public performance was at the Algonquin Hotel in 1934. After a long career involving many kinds of music, Botsford died in New York on February 1, 1949, twenty-three days before his 75th birthday.

== Legacy ==
"Black and White Rag"
Botsford's "Black and White Rag", published in 1908.

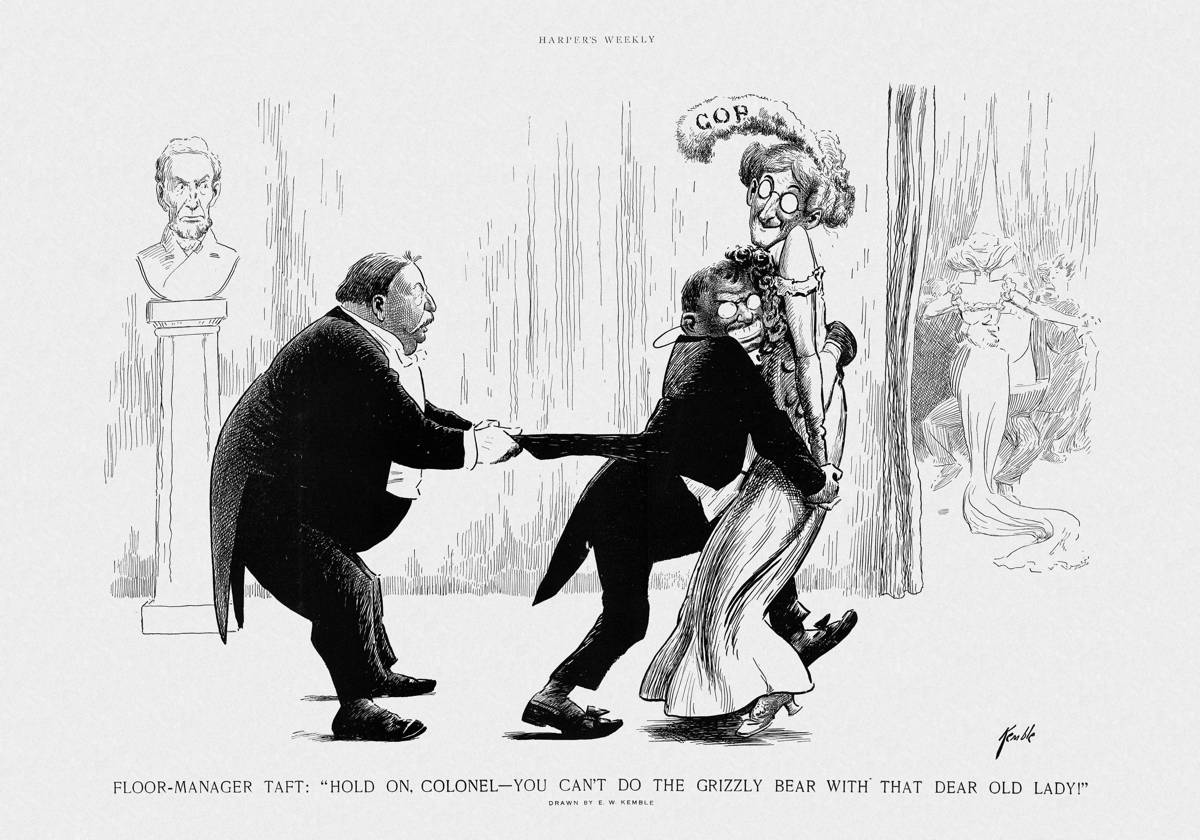
A 1912 political cartoon about the Republican Party Presidential conflict between William Howard Taft and Theodore Roosevelt referencing the "Grizzly Bear" dance

"Pride of the Prairie" is a prime example of Tin Pan Alley's response to the rising popularity of cowboy music. Many western-themed songs were being released by New York ragtime composers at the time, but Prairie would become a part of the era's folk music catalogue, eventually being recorded by numerous country and folk acts including Aaron Campbell's Mountaineers, Tex Owens, and Patsy Montana.

"Black and White Rag" sold over 200,000 copies in 1908, and eventually topped one million copies sold. The song was recorded by numerous artists, but most notably by Winifred Atwell, whose 1953 recording became a gold record and was used as the theme of the long-running BBC2 snooker tournament show, "Pot Black". The song was also used as theme music for the 1985 video game Repton.

"Grizzly Bear Rag" initially saw moderate success, but jumped in popularity when Irving Berlin composed lyrics for it. The song was recorded under titles including Dance of the Grizzly Bear and Doin' the Grizzly Bear, and helped spark a trend of naming dances after animals; the most notable example of this being the foxtrot.

"Sailing Down the Chesapeake Bay" became very popular in its time, and was recorded later by Bing Crosby for his 1975 album, A Southern Memoir.

== Compositions ==
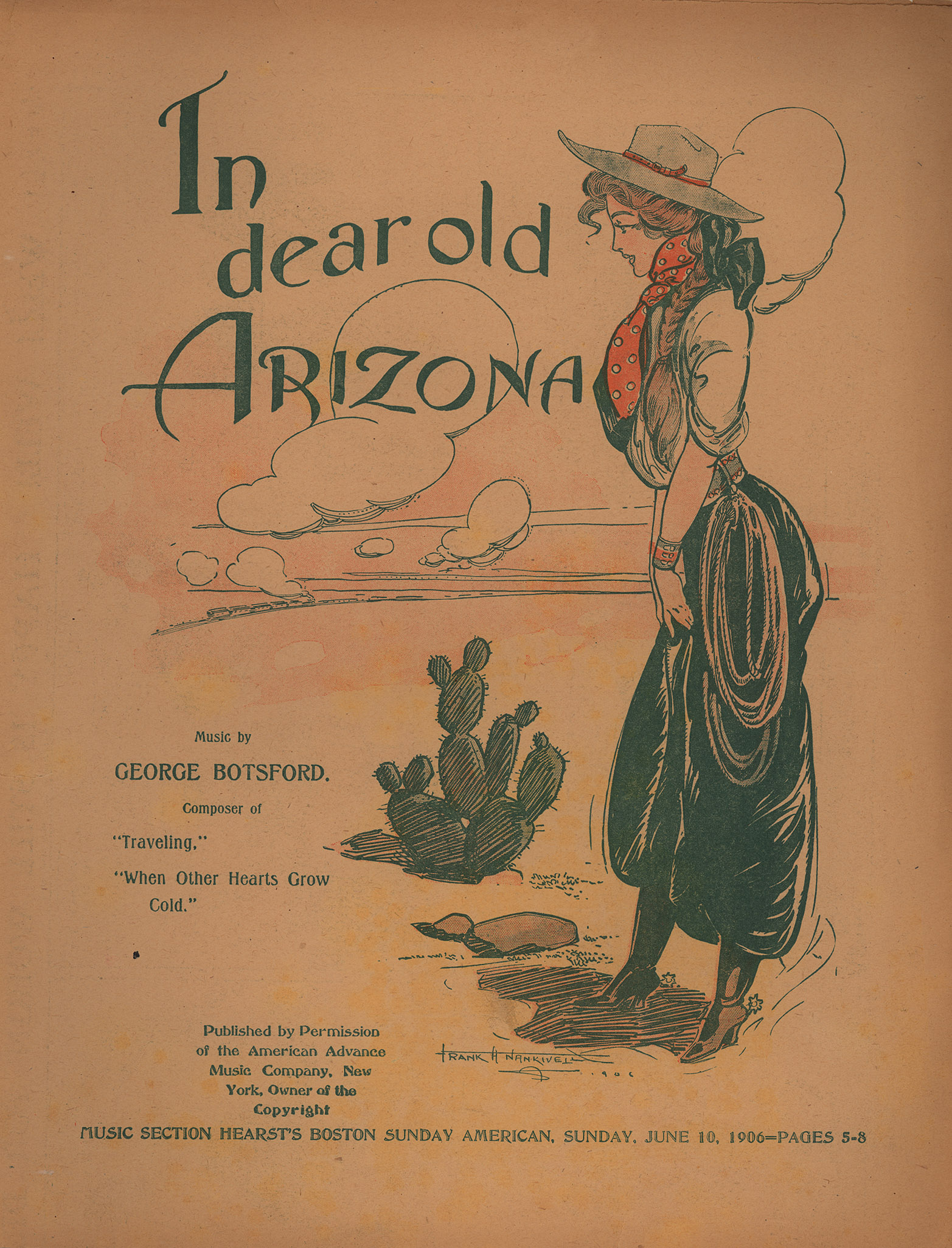
The cover of Botsford's "In Dear Old Arizona", published in 1906.

- "The Katy Flyer" (1899)
- "Dance of the Water Nymphs" (1906)
- "In Dear Old Arizona" (1906)
- "Pride of the Prairie" (1907)
- "The Big Jubilee" (1908)
- "Klondike Rag" (1908)
- "Black and White Rag" (1908)
- "Old Crow Rag" (1909)
- "Wiggle Rag" (1909)
- "Texas Steer Rag" (1909)
- "Pianophiends Rag" (1909)
- "Chatterbox Rag" (1910)
- "Lovey-Dovey Rag" (1910)
- "Grizzly Bear Rag" (1910)
- "Honeysuckle Rag" (1911)
- "Honey Girl" (1911)
- "Hyacinth" (1911)
- "Royal Flush" (1911)
- "Eskimo Rag" (1912)
- "Buck-Eye Rag" (1913)
- "Incandescent Rag" (1913)
- "Universal Rag" (1913)
- "Rag, Baby Mine" (1913)
- "Sailing Down the Chesapeake Bay" (1913)
- "Boomerang Rag" (1916)
- "On the Old Dominion Line" (1916)

== See also ==
- List of ragtime composers
