= The Worst Is Yet to Come =

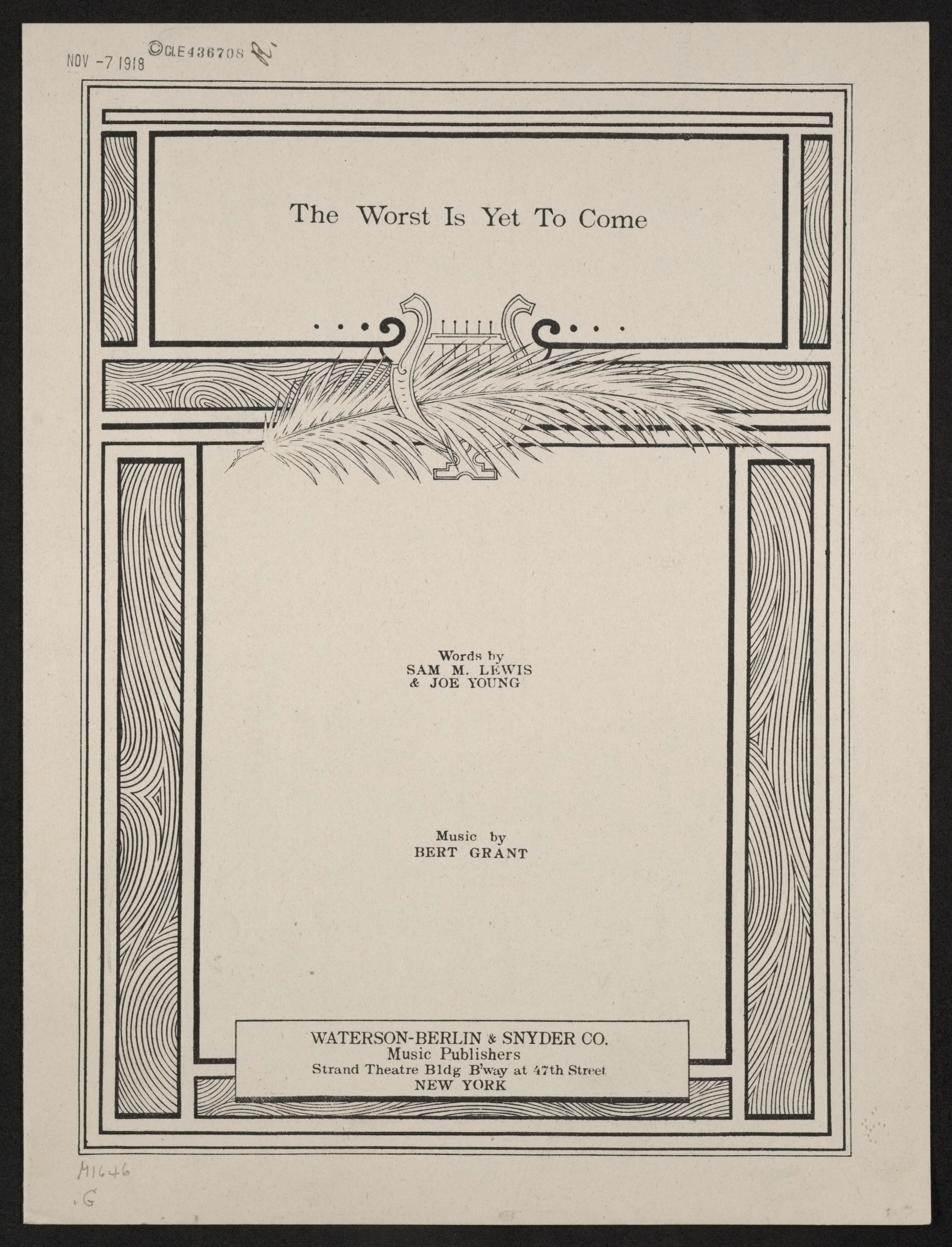
- Sheet music cover

Song by Bill Murray
- Recorded: December 12, 1918
- Length: 3:14
- Label: Victor
- Composer(s): Bert Grant
- Lyricist(s): Sam M. Lewis, Joe Young

"The Worst Is Yet to Come" is a World War I-era song recorded on December 12, 1918 in Camden, New Jersey. Sam M. Lewis and Joe Young provided the lyrics. Bert Grant was the composer. The song was published by Waterson, Berlin & Snyder, Inc. in New York City. Billy Murray performed the song. Artist Albert Wilfred Barbelle designed the cover art for the sheet music. On one version of the cover, a soldier is in position to bayonet a prisoner in bed.

The lyrics of the song blatantly mock Wilhelm II, the German Emperor during World War I. The second verse reads:

Oh! Willie, Willie, wild fellow,
Growing up so high,
You'd better order your coffin now
Because you're gonna die!

The chorus of the song joyfully states to the Germans that it's only going to get worse from here, and that the "crazy Kaiser" must give up:

But the worst is yet to come,
The worst is yet to come,
You won't know what it's all about
Or where it's coming from.
You said you'd plaster Paris
With your Hindenburg machine,
But now it looks as if you're on the road to Paris Green.
But the worst is yet to come.
You tried to put whole world on the bum;
Now, you crazy Kaiser, you've got to give up,
You've got to give up,
You've got to give up;
But don't let it worry you,
The worst is yet to come!
