= At the Moving Picture Ball =

"At the Moving Picture Ball" is a popular song composed by Joseph H. Santly (né Joseph Harry Santly; 1886–1962) and recorded by many artists during the silent film era. Today the song is best remembered for its unusually topical lyrics, which mention many celebrities of the time. In fact, by 1920, the lyrics of the song had already been changed, since several celebrities mentioned had lost popularity. Judy Garland and Donald O'Connor performed the song on the 1963 TV series, The Judy Garland Show, during a "tribute to vaudeville" medley.

== Selected discography ==
Atlantic Records
Bobby Short (1956)
Atlantic 1230
OCLC 18728754
(audio sample via YouTube)

Argo Records, London
Hip Hooray for Neville Chamberlain (1974)
Ian Whitcomb
Argo ZDA162
OCLC 30328354

== Copyright ==
- "At the Moving Picture Ball"

Howard Johnson (words)
Joseph Santly (music)
Leo Feist, Inc., New York
© 8 January 1920; E470306
OCLC 25600636
Sheet music, courtesy of Johns Hopkins University Libraries
Note: The sheet music cover art (unsigned) – in red, white, and black – shows movie stars in burlesque attire at a masquerade party
