= 1916 in music =

This is a list of notable events in music that took place in the year 1916.

== Specific locations ==
- 1916 in British music
- 1916 in Norwegian music

== Specific genres ==
- 1916 in jazz

== Events ==
- February 1 – Carl Nielsen conducts the première of his Symphony No. 4, the Inextinguishable, in Copenhagen.
- February 11 – Baltimore Symphony Orchestra presents its first concert.
- March 3 – The Original Dixieland Jass Band begin playing at Schiller's Cafe in Chicago, Illinois, under the name Stein's Dixie Jass Band.
- March 10 – Sir Hubert Parry writes the choral setting of William Blake's poem "And did those feet in ancient time" which becomes known as "Jerusalem" (first performed 28 March at the Queen's Hall, London).
- April 28 – Edison Records carry out the first public "comparison test" between live and recorded singing voices at Carnegie Hall, featuring soprano Marie Rappold.
- June 5 – Stein's Dixie Jass Band plays its first concert under its new name, the Original Dixieland Jass Band.
- August 3 – The musical comedy Chu Chin Chow, written, produced, directed and starring Oscar Asche, with music by Frederic Norton, premières at His Majesty's Theatre in London. It will run for five years and a total of 2,238 performances (more than twice as many as any previous musical), a West End theatre record that will stand for nearly forty years.
- December – Wilbur Sweatman records his hot ragtime for Emerson Records in New York City.
- Gustav Holst completes composition of his orchestral suite The Planets, Op. 32, in England.
- Sydney Conservatorium of Music in Australia accepts its first students.
- Soprano Hedy Iracema-Brügelmann is awarded the Charlottenkreuz.
- German soprano Vali von der Osten marries tenor Fritz Windgassen.

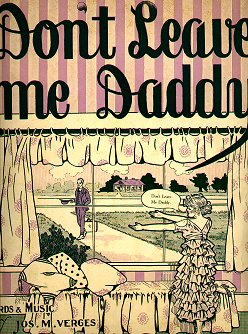

== Published popular music ==
- "Beale Street Blues" w.m. W. C. Handy
- "Bugle Call Rag" w.m. Eubie Blake & Carey Morgan
- "Don't Leave Me, Daddy" Joe Verges
- "For Dixie And Uncle Sam" w. J. Keirn Brennan m. Ernest R. Ball
- "Homesickness Blues" w.m. Cliff Hess
- "I Ain't Got Nobody" w. Roger Graham & Dave Peyton m. Spencer Williams
- "If You Were the Only Girl (in the World)" w. Clifford Grey m. Nat D. Ayer
- "I'm Sorry I Made You Cry" w.m. Nicholas J. Clesi
- "Ireland Must Be Heaven, for My Mother Came from There" w. Joseph McCarthy & Howard Johnson m. Fred Fisher
- "The Laddies Who Fought And Won" w.m. Harry Lauder
- "Li'l Liza Jane" w.m. Countess Ada De Lachau
- "Love Me At Twilight" w. William Jerome & Joe Young m. Bert Grant
- "O'Brien Is Tryin' To Learn To Talk Hawaiian" w. Al Dubin m. Rennie Cormack
- "Poor Butterfly" w. John Golden m. Raymond Hubbell
- "Pretty Baby" w. Gus Kahn m. Tony Jackson & Egbert Van Alstyne
- "Roses of Picardy" w. Frederic Weatherly m. Haydn Wood

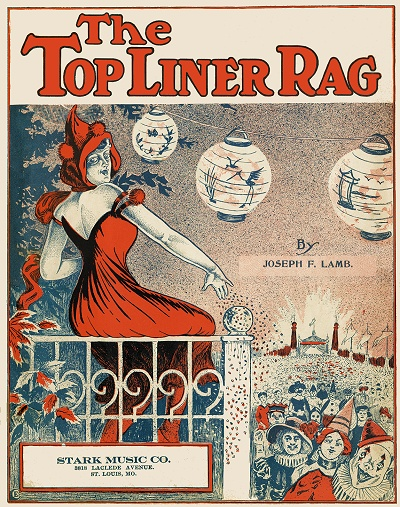
Joseph Lamb's 1916 "The Top Liner Rag", a classic rag

- "Take Me Back to Dear Old Blighty" w.m. A. J. Mills, Fred Godfrey & Bennett Scott
- "What Do You Want to Make Those Eyes at Me For?" w. Joseph McCarthy & Howard Johnson m. James V. Monaco

== Hit recordings ==
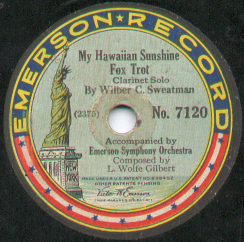
Wilber Sweatman record

- "O Sole Mio" by Enrico Caruso
- "Santa Lucia" by Enrico Caruso
- "Somewhere a Voice is Calling" by John McCormack
- "Where Did Robinson Crusoe Go With Friday On Saturday Night?" by Al Jolson
- "I Love a Piano" by Billy Murray
- "Pretty Baby" by Billy Murray
- "I'm Gonna Make Hay While the Sun Shines in Virginia" by Marion Harris
- "Keep the Home Fires Burning ('Till the Boys Comes Home)" by James F. Harrison
- "There's A Long Long Trail A-Winding" by James F. Harrison
- "Ireland Must Be Heaven, For My Mother Came From There" by Charles Harrison

== Classical music ==
- Kurt Atterberg – Symphony no. 3, "West Coast Pictures"
- Béla Bartók – Suite for Piano
- Ernest Bloch –
  - Israel Symphony
  - String Quartet No. 1
- Lili Boulanger – Psaume 24
- Claude Debussy – Sonata for flute, viola, and harp
- Frederick Delius – Cello Sonata
- George Enescu – Piano Trio in A minor
- Alexander Glazunov – Karelian Legend
- Jesus Guridi – Una aventura de Don Quijote
- Paul Hindemith – Cello Concerto in E-flat, Op. 3
- Ludvig Holm – Concerto for violin and orchestra in G major
- Charles Ives – Fourth Symphony
- Scott Joplin
  - Symphony No. 1 (lost)
  - Piano Concerto (lost)
- Erkki Melartin – Symphony no 5 in A minor, Op. 90 ("Sinfonia brevis")
- Henrique Oswald – Sonata-Fantasia in E-flat major, Op. 44 (cello and piano)
- Hubert Parry – "Jerusalem"
- Siegfried Salomon – Concerto for Violin and Orchestra in G minor
- Igor Stravinsky – Renard: Burlesque for 4 pantomimes and chamber orchestra
- Heitor Villa-Lobos –
  - Second Cello Sonata
  - String Quartet No. 3
  - Symphony No. 1 "O imprevisto" (The Unforeseen)

== Opera ==
- Rutland Boughton – The Round Table
- Enrique Granados – Goyescas, Metropolitan Opera, New York City, 28 January
- Erwin Lendvai – Elga
- Manuel Penella – El Gato Montés
- Felix Weingartner – Dame Kobold
- Charles Villiers Stanford and Cairns James, The Critic, or An Opera Rehearsed

== Film ==
- Joseph Carl Breil – The Birth of a Nation
- Victor Herbert – The Fall of a Nation

== Musical theater ==
- Betty Broadway production opened at the Globe Theatre on October 2 and ran for 63 performances
- Broadway And Buttermilk Broadway production opened at Maxine Elliott's Theatre on August 15 and ran for 23 performances
- Chu Chin Chow London production opened at His Majesty's Theatre on August 31 and ran for a record 2238 performances.
- Follow Me Broadway production opened at the Casino Theatre on November 29 and ran for 78 performances
- Pell Mell London production opened at the Ambassadors Theatre on June 5 and ran for 298 performances
- Robinson Crusoe Jr Broadway production opened on February 17 at the Winter Garden Theatre and ran for 139 performances
- So Long Letty Broadway production opened at the Shubert Theatre on October 23 and ran for 96 performances
- Sybil Broadway production opened on January 10 at the Liberty Theatre and ran for 168 performances. Starring Julia Sanderson, Donald Brian and Joseph Cawthorn.
- We're All in It London revue opened at the Empire Theatre on July 13
- Ziegfeld Follies Of 1916 Broadway revue opened at the New Amsterdam Theatre on June 12 and ran for 112 performances

== Births ==
- January 4 – Slim Gaillard, jazz musician (d. 1991)
- January 9 – Vic Mizzy, television theme composer (d. 2009)
- January 14 – Maxwell Davis, R&B musician (d. 1970)
- January 15 – Artie Shapiro, jazz bassist (d. 2003)
- January 16 – Rudolf Benesh, developer of the Benesh Movement Notation for dancing (d. 1975)
- January 22 – Henri Dutilleux, French composer (d. 2013)
- February 5 – Daniel Santos, singer (d. 1992)
- February 8 – Jimmy Skidmore, jazz musician (d. 1998)
- February 22 – Pedro Junco, composer (d. 1939)
- February 29 – Dinah Shore, singer (d. 1994)
- March 6 – Red Callender, jazz musician (d. 1992)
- March 10 – Jan Håkan Åberg, organist and composer (d. 2012)
- March 15 – Harry James, bandleader (d. 1983)
- March 17 – Ray Ellington, singer and bandleader (d. 1985)
- March 21 – Bismillah Khan, shehnai player (d. 2006)
- March 26 – Harry Rabinowitz, screen music composer and conductor (d. 2016)
- April 3 – Louiguy, Spanish-born French composer (d. 1991)
- April 11 – Alberto Ginastera, Argentinian composer (d. 1983)
- April 12 – Russell Garcia, American film score composer (d. 2011)
- April 14 – Denis ApIvor, British composer (d. 2004)
- April 15 – Lee Vincent, American DJ and orchestra leader (d. 2007)
- April 22 – Yehudi Menuhin, American-born British violinist (d. 1999)
- April 30 – Robert Shaw, American conductor (d. 1999)
- May 6 – Adriana Caselotti, voice (and model) for Snow White (d. 1997)
- May 9 – Bernard Rose, organist and composer (d. 1996)
- May 10 – Milton Babbitt, composer (d. 2011)
- May 17 – Paul Quinichette, jazz musician (d. 1983)
- May 21 – Lydia Mendoza, guitarist and singer (d. 2007)
- May 26 – Moondog, singer, percussionist, composer and inventor of musical instruments (d. 1999)
- June 8 – Freddie Webster, American jazz musician (d. 1947)
- June 15 – Horacio Salgán, Argentine tango pianist, composer and orchestra leader (d. 2016)
- June 17 – Einar Englund, Finnish composer (died 1999)
- June 18 – Roman Toi, Estonian-born Canadian composer, choir conductor, and organist (d. 2018)
- June 23 – Al G. Wright, British-born American bandleader and conductor (d. 2020)
- June 26 – Giuseppe Taddei, Italian operatic baritone (d. 2010)
- July 5 – Lívia Rév, Hungarian classical pianist (d. 2018)
- July 9
  - Dean Goffin, New Zealand Salvation Army composer (d. 1984)
  - Edward Heath, Prime Minister of the United Kingdom, organist and conductor (d. 2005)
- July 12 – Sam Taylor, American jazz musician (d.1980)
- July 16 – Miles Copeland, Jr., American musician and CIA agent (d. 1991)
- July 24 – Bob Eberly, American singer with Jimmy Dorsey's Orchestra (d. 1981)
- July 28 – Rosina Raisbeck, Australian operatic mezzo-soprano (d. 2006)
- July 29 – Charlie Christian, American jazz guitarist (d. 1942)
- August 3 – Claude Demetrius, songwriter (d. 1988)
- August 18 – Moura Lympany, pianist (d. 2005)
- August 21
  - Bill Lee, singer (d. 1980)
  - Consuelo Velázquez, singer-songwriter and pianist (d. 2005)
- August 22 – Paddy Fahey, Irish fiddler (d. 2019)
- August 24 – Léo Ferré, singer-songwriter and composer (d. 1993)
- August 27 – Martha Raye, American singer and actress (d. 1994)
- September 8 – René Touzet, pianist, composer and bandleader (d. 2003)
- September 16 – M. S. Subbulakshmi, Carnatic vocalist (d. 2004)
- October 3 – David Mann, songwriter (d. 2002)
- October 19
  - Karl-Birger Blomdahl, composer and conductor (d. 1968)
  - Emil Gilels, Ukrainian classical pianist (d. 1985)
- October 28 – Bill Harris, jazz trombonist (d. 1973)
- October 29 – Hadda Brooks, pianist, singer and composer (d. 2002)
- November 6 – Ray Conniff, trombonist and bandleader (d. 2002)
- November 10 – Billy May, composer and arranger (d. 2004)
- November 15 – Greta Gynt, singer, dancer and actress (d. 2000)
- November 29 - Helen Clare, British singer (d. 2018)
- December 11 – Perez Prado, Cuban bandleader and composer (d. 1989)
- December 15 – Buddy Cole, jazz musician (d. 1964)
- December 18 – Betty Grable, star of many Hollywood musicals (d. 1973)
- December 25
  - Oscar Moore, jazz guitarist (d. 1981)
  - Graciela Naranjo, Venezuelan singer and actress (d. 2001)
- December 27 – Johnny Frigo, American jazz violinist and bassist (d. 2007)

== Deaths ==
- January 15 – Franz Wilczek, violinist (b. 1869)
- January 16 – Charles A. Zimmerman, composer (b. 1861)
- January 21 – George Musgrove, theatre and opera producer (b. 1854)
- February 4 – Adolphe Biarent, cellist and composer (b. 1871)
- February 5 – Francesco Marconi, operatic tenor (b. 1853/1855)
- February 20 – Giovanni Sbriglia, operatic tenor and singing teacher (b. 1832)
- March 7 – José Ferrer, guitarist (b. 1835)
- March 24 – Enrique Granados, composer (b. 1867)
- May 11 – Max Reger, composer (b. 1873)
- May 13
  - Clara Louise Kellogg, singer (b. 1842)
  - Jessie MacLachlan, Gaelic singer (b. 1866)
- May 28 – Albert Lavignac, musicologist and composer (b. 1846)
- June 5 – Mildred J. Hill, songwriter (b. 1859)
- June 10 – Max Vogrich, pianist and composer (b. 1852)
- August 2 – Hamish MacCunn, composer (b. 1868)
- August 5 – George Butterworth, composer (b. 1885) (killed in action)
- August 8 – Franz Eckert, composer (b. 1852)
- September 10 – Friedrich Gernsheim, pianist, conductor and composer (b. 1839)
- September 15 – Julius Fučík, composer (b. 1872)
- November 2 – Marie Wieck, pianist, singer, piano teacher and composer (b. 1832)
- November 13 – Frederick Septimus Kelly, composer and Olympic rower (b. 1881) (killed in action)
- November 23 – Eduard Nápravník, conductor and composer (b. 1839)
- November 24 – John Francis Barnett, composer and music teacher (b. 1837)
- November 26 – Charlie Case, vaudeville entertainer (b. c. 1860)
- December 2 – Francesco Paolo Tosti, composer and music teacher (b. 1846)
- December 5 – Hans Richter, conductor (b. 1843)
- December 20 – William W. Gilchrist, composer (b. 1846)
- December 28 – Eduard Strauss, composer (b. 1835)
- December 31 – Ernst Rudorff, composer and music teacher (b. 1840)
