= 1916 in British music =

This is a summary of 1916 in music in the United Kingdom.

== Events ==
- 28 March – Sir Hubert Parry's choral setting of William Blake's poem "And did those feet in ancient time" (which becomes known as "Jerusalem"), is premièred at the Queen's Hall, London, having been written on 10 March.
- Gustav Holst completes composition of his orchestral suite The Planets, Op. 32.

== Popular music ==
- Harry Castling & Harry Carlton – "The Tanks That Broke the Ranks Out in Picardy"
- A. J. Mills, Fred Godfrey & Bennett Scott – "Take Me Back to Dear Old Blighty"
- Ivor Novello and Lena Guilbert Ford – "Keep the Home Fires Burning"
- Frederic Weatherly & Eric Coates – "Green Hills Of Somerset"
- Frederic Weatherly & Haydn Wood – "Roses of Picardy"
- P. G. Wodehouse, Herbert Reynolds & Emmerich Kallman – "Throw Me A Rose"

== Classical music: new works ==
- Kenneth J. Alford – The Great Little Army, march
- Frederick Delius – Cello Sonata
- Gustav Holst – The Planets
- John Ireland – Two Songs, 1916

== Opera ==
- Rutland Boughton – The Round Table

== Musical theatre ==
- 13 May – The Happy Day by Seymour Hicks, with music by Sidney Jones and Paul Rubens, and lyrics by Adrian Ross, opens at Daly's Theatre, starring Winifred Barnes, José Collins and Arthur Wontner, where it runs for 241 performances.
- 3 August – The musical comedy Chu Chin Chow, written, produced, directed and starring Oscar Asche, with music by Frederic Norton, premières at His Majesty's Theatre in London's West End, starring Asche himself, Frank Cochrane and Courtice Pounds. It will run for five years and a total of 2,238 performances (twice as many as any previous musical), a record that will stand for nearly forty years.

== Births ==
- 3 January – Joan Ingpen, opera talent manager (died 2007)
- 8 February – Jimmy Skidmore, jazz musician (died 1998)
- 13 February – John Reed, actor and opera singer (died 2010)
- 3 March – Bernard Stevens, composer (died 1983)
- 17 March – Ray Ellington (born Harry Brown), singer (died 1985)
- 14 April – Denis ApIvor, composer (died 2004)
- 9 May – Bernard Rose, organist and composer (died 1996)
- 9 July – Edward Heath, Prime Minister of the United Kingdom, organist and conductor (died 2005)
- 11 July – Reg Varney, actor and pianist (died 2008)
- 11 August – Benny Lee, comedy actor and singer (died 1995)
- 18 August – Moura Lympany (born Mary Johnstone), pianist (died 2005)
- 29 November – Helen Clare (born Nellie Harrison), singer (died 2018)
- date unknown – Malcolm MacDonald, composer (died 1992)

== Deaths ==
- 21 January – George Musgrove, theatre and opera producer, 62
- 13 May – Jessie MacLachlan, Gaelic singer, 50
- 2 August – Hamish MacCunn, composer, 48 (throat cancer)
- 5 August – George Butterworth, composer, 31 (killed in action)
- 13 November – Frederick Septimus Kelly, composer and Olympic rower, 35 (killed in action)
- 24 November – John Francis Barnett, composer and music teacher, 79

== See also ==
- 1916 in the United Kingdom
