= Charlotte Cross =

Charlotte Cross may refer to:

- Charlotte Cross (Haven), a fictional character in the TV series
- Charlottenkreuz ("Charlotte Cross"), a decoration of the Kingdom of Württemberg
