= Ireland Must Be Heaven, for My Mother Came from There =

1916 song

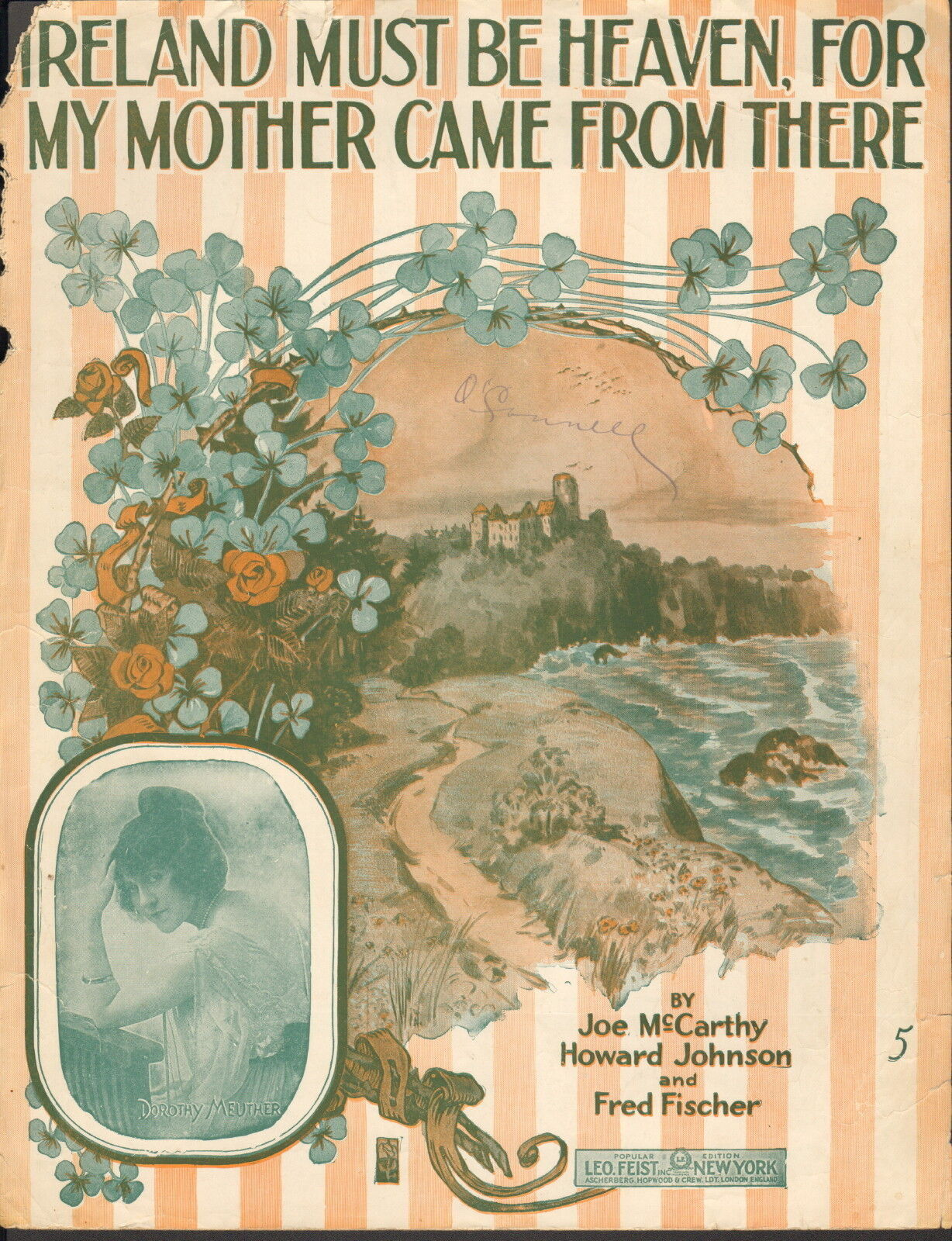
Sheet music cover, 1916

"Ireland Must Be Heaven, for My Mother Came from There" is a popular song with the music composition by Fred Fisher and lyrics done by Joseph McCarthy and Howard Johnson, published in 1916.

A version of the song recorded by Charles W. Harrison in 1916 is considered to have been a #1 hit in its day.

The song was also popular in Britain in 1916.
