= Rhythmicon =

Electro-mechanical musical instrument

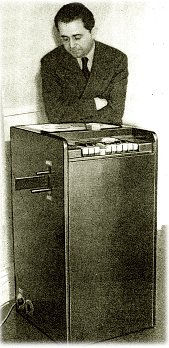
Joseph Schillinger and the Rhythmicon (1932)

Rhythmicon
Example of what a rhythmicon would sound like if all the keys were pressed down. Fundamental = C1.

The Rhythmicon, also known as the Polyrhythmophone, was an electro-mechanical musical instrument designed and built by Leon Theremin in 1930 for composer Henry Cowell, intended to reveal connections between rhythms, pitches and the harmonic series. It used a series of perforated spinning disks, similar to a Nipkow disk, to interrupt the flow of light between bulbs and phototoreceptors aligned with the disk perforations. The interrupted signals created oscillations which were perceived as rhythms or tones depending on the speed of the disks. It generated both pitches and rhythms, and has been described as a precursor of drum machines.

== Development ==
In 1930, the avant-garde American composer and musical theorist Henry Cowell collaborated with Russian inventor Léon Theremin in designing and building the remarkably innovative Rhythmicon. Cowell wanted an instrument with which to play compositions involving multiple rhythmic patterns impossible for one person to perform simultaneously on acoustic keyboard or percussion instruments. The invention, completed by Theremin in 1931, can produce up to sixteen different rhythms—a periodic base rhythm on a selected fundamental pitch and fifteen progressively more rapid rhythms, each associated with one of the ascending notes of the fundamental pitch's overtone series. Like the overtone series itself, the rhythms follow an arithmetic progression, so that for every single beat of the fundamental, the first overtone (if played) beats twice, the second overtone beats three times, and so forth. Using the device's keyboard, each of the sixteen rhythms can be produced individually or in any combination. A seventeenth key permits optional syncopation. The instrument produces its percussion-like sound using a system, proposed by Cowell, that involves light being passed through radially indexed holes in a series of spinning "cogwheel" disks before arriving at electric photoreceptors.

Nicolas Slonimsky described its capabilities in 1933:

The rhythmicon can play triplets against quintuplets, or any other combination up to 16 notes in a group. The metrical index is associated ... with the corresponding frequence of vibrations.... Quintuplets are ... sounded on the fifth harmonic, nonuplets on the ninth harmonic, and so forth. A complete chord of sixteen notes presents sixteen rhythmical figures in sixteen harmonics within the range of four octaves. All sixteen notes coincide, with the beginning of each period, thus producing a synthetic harmonic series of tones.

Schillinger once calculated that it would take 455 days, 2 hours, and 30 minutes to play all the combinations available on the Rhythmicon, assuming an average duration of 10 seconds for each combination. The early introduction of the instrument was fortunate for Cowell and Theremin as brothers Otto and Benjamin Miessner has also been working on a similar instrument with the same name.

== Introduction ==
Cowell had planned to exhibit the rhythmicon in Europe. In October 1931, in a letter to Ives from Berlin, he said, "I have been composing and have finished the second movement of my work for the Rhythmicon with orchestra for Nicolas to use in Paris in February." Composer Charles Ives, Cowell's close friend, commissioned Theremin to build a second model of the Rhythmicon for use by Cowell and his associate, conductor Nicolas Slonimsky.

The Rhythmicon was publicly premiered January 19, 1932 by Cowell and fellow music educator and theorist Joseph Schillinger at the New School for Social Research in New York. Schillinger had known Theremin since the early 1920s and had a lifelong interest in technology and music.

The radically new instrument attracted considerable attention, and Cowell wrote a number of compositions for it, including Rhythmicana, 1931 (later renamed 'Concerto for Rhythmicon and Orchestra'), and Music for Violin and Rhythmicon (1932). Slonimsky said that Cowell's special piece Rhythmicana (presumably the one Cowell referred to in his letters to Ives) was completed too late to be used at the Paris concerts.

On May 15, 1932, a New Music Society concert in San Francisco included – along with the premiere of Xanadu, a new work by Mildred Couper – a demonstration of Cowell's new instrument. According to some sources, the concert premiered Cowell's "Rhythmicana", in four movements with orchestra, and "Music for Violin and Rhythmicon". According to several others, the Rhythmicana concerto was not performed publicly until 1971, and it was played on a computer. (Cowell later used the same title, Rhythmicana, for a set of solo piano pieces he composed in 1938.)

Before long the shine wore off. In 1988, Slonimsky wrote:

Like many a futuristic contraption, the Rhythmicon was wonderful in every respect, except that it did not work. It was not until forty years later that an electronic instrument with similar specifications was constructed at Stanford University. It could do everything that Cowell and Theremin had wanted it to do and more, but it lacked the emotional quality essential to music. It sounded sterile, antiseptic, lifeless — like a robot with a synthetic voice.

Cowell soon left the Rhythmicon behind to pursue other interests and it was all but forgotten for many years.

== Later years ==
The third Rhythmicon constructed by Theremin

One of the original instruments built by Theremin wound up at Stanford University; the other stayed with Slonimsky, from whom it later passed to Schillinger and then the Smithsonian Institution. This latter instrument is operational; its sound has been described as "percussive, almost drum-like". Theremin later (in early 1960s) built a third, more compact model after his return to the Soviet Union toward the end of the 1930s. This version of the instrument is operational and now resides at the Theremin Center in Moscow.

According to many unsubstantiated accounts, in the 1960s, innovative pop music producer Joe Meek experimented with the instrument, though it seems very unlikely that he had access to any of the original three devices; similarly, a number of accounts claim, without substantiation, that the Rhythmicon may be heard in the soundtracks of several movies, including Dr. Strangelove.

More recently, composer Nick Didkovsky designed and programmed a virtual Rhythmicon using Java Music Specification Language and JSyn. Edmund Eagan also created a Cowell Triangles preset for the Haken Audio Continuum Fingerboard (Firmware 9.5 released 01–2021).

In 2019, Tufts University hosted the premiere of Cowell's 1931 Rhythmicana (Concerto for Rhythmicon and Orchestra) performed by the Tufts Electronic Music Ensemble, led by Paul D. Lehrman. The performance featured a reconstruction of the Rhythmicon played, designed and built by Mike Buffington for multi-instrumentalist and composer Wally de Backer.

== See also ==
- Leon Theremin#Some of Theremin's inventions
- Polyrhythm
