= Frederick Bristol =

American voice teacher (1839–1932)

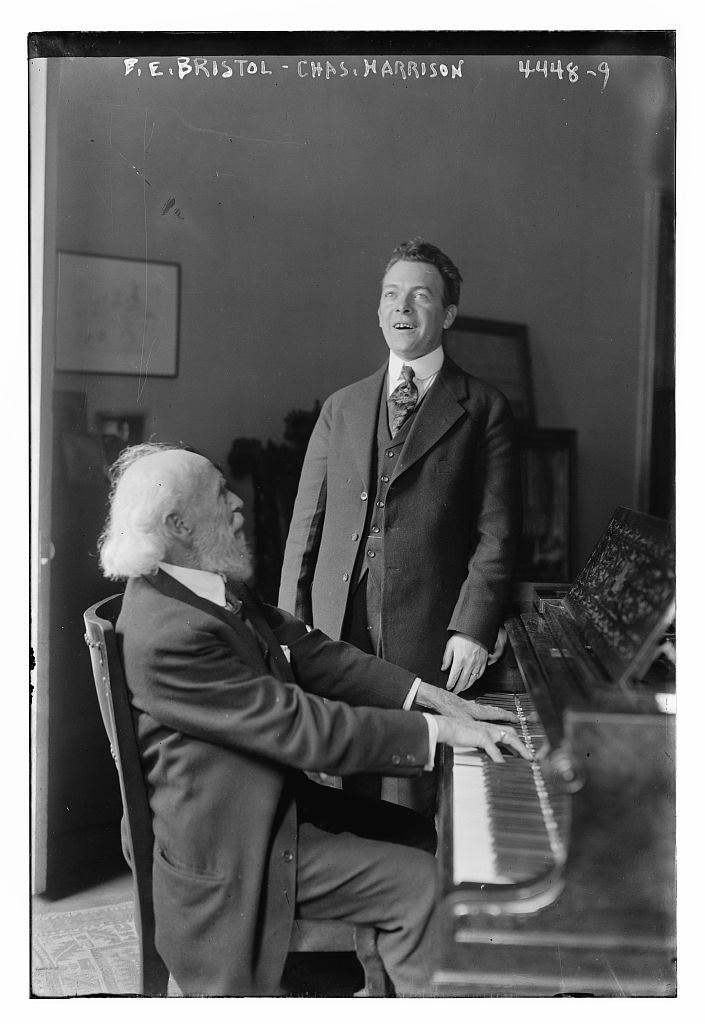
Charles W. Harrison and Frederick E. Bristol in 1918 in New York City

Frederick E. Bristol (4 November 1839 in Brookfield, Connecticut – 1932 in N.Y. City, New York) was a celebrated American voice teacher who operated private studios in Boston and New York City during the second half of the 19th century and early 20th century.

== Biography ==
He began teaching singing in 1869 and the 60th anniversary of his teaching career was recognized by an article in North American Review in 1929. His pupils included Metropolitan Opera sopranos Olive Fremstad Alice Nielsen, and Marie Sundelius; Chicago Grand Opera Company soprano Myrna Sharlow; concert sopranos Edith Chapman Goold and Emma Cecilia Thursby; Broadway and concert tenor Charles W. Harrison; French tenor Edmond Clément; baritone and longtime head of the voice department at Sarah Lawrence College Jerome Swinford; concert, light opera and vaudeville soprano Bertha Waltzinger; composer W. Otto Miessner; and bass and former head of University of Michigan music department William Howland. He also operated a summer music camp with the assistance of Enrica Clay Dillon in Harrison, Maine.
