= Wurlitzer electronic piano =

Mid-1950s – mid-1980s electric piano

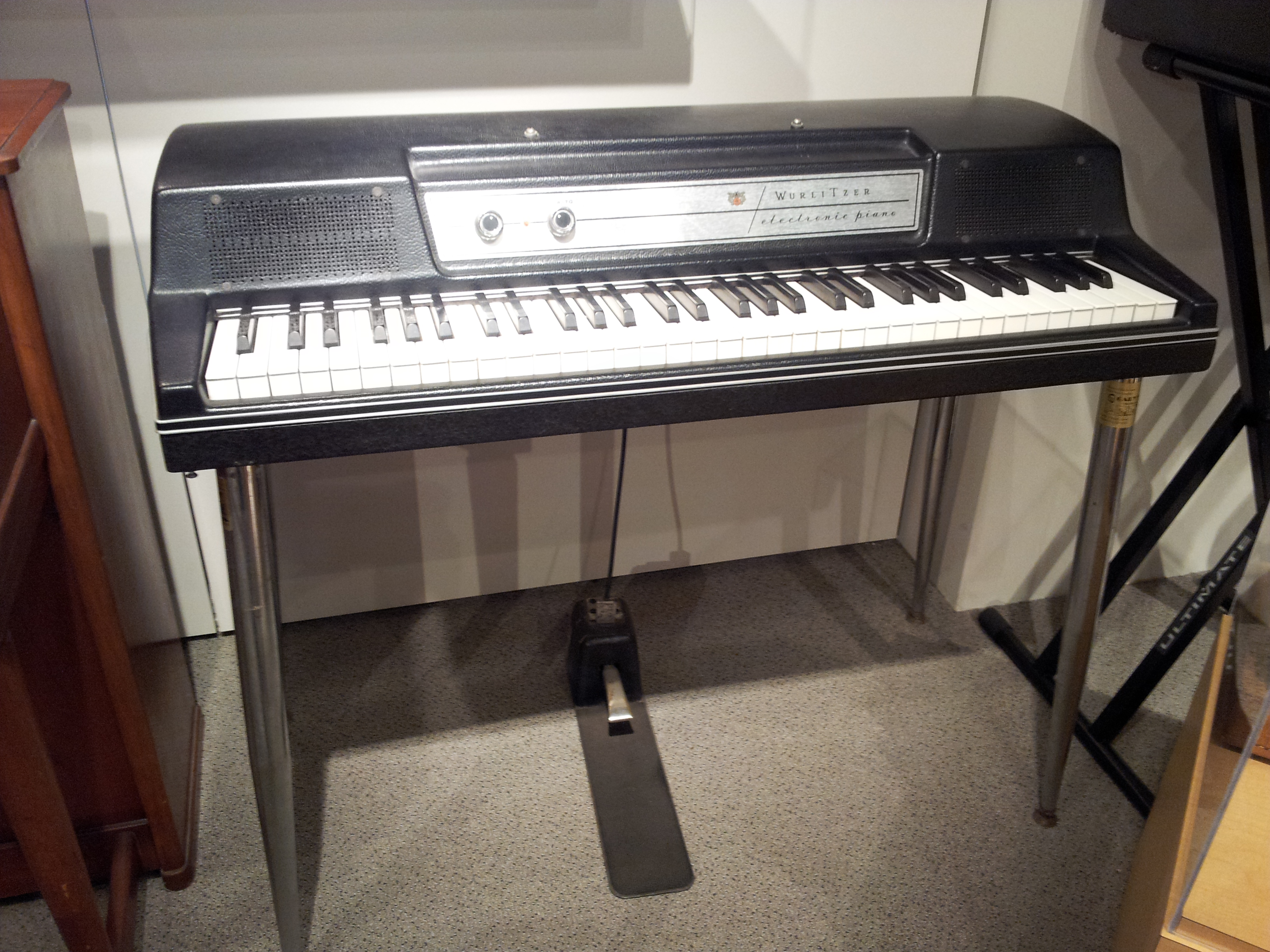
- A Wurlitzer 200A, the most commercially successful model
- Manufacturer: Wurlitzer
- Dates: 1954–1983

Technical specifications
- Polyphony: Full
- Synthesis type: Electromechanical
- Effects: Vibrato (single speed)

Input/output
- Keyboard: 64 keys

The Wurlitzer electronic piano is an electric piano manufactured and marketed by Wurlitzer from 1954 to 1983. Though marketed as electronic, sound is generated by striking a metal reed with a hammer, which induces an electric current in a pickup. It is conceptually similar to the Rhodes piano, though the sound is different.

The instrument was invented by Benjamin Miessner, who had worked on various types of electric pianos since the early 1930s. The first Wurlitzer was manufactured in 1954, and production continued until 1983. Originally, the piano was designed to be used in the classroom, and several dedicated teacher and student instruments were manufactured. It was adapted for more conventional live performances, including stage models with attachable legs and console models with built-in frames. The stage instrument was used by several popular artists, including Ray Charles, Joe Zawinul and Supertramp. Several electronic keyboards include an emulation of the Wurlitzer.

As the Wurlitzer is an electromechanical instrument, it can need occasional maintenance, such as re-tuning and replacing broken reeds. Its action and performance makes it stable enough for years of use.

== Sound ==
Wurlitzer piano
A Wurlitzer electronic piano, showing the velocity sensitivity

The sound of a Wurlitzer electronic piano is generated electromechanically by striking a metal reed with a felt hammer, using conventional piano action. This induces an electrical current in an electrostatic pickup system running at 170 V DC.

Most Wurlitzer pianos are 64-note instruments whose keyboard range is from A an octave above the lowest note of a standard 88-note piano to the C an octave below its top note. The instrument is fitted with a mechanical sustain pedal. It has one, two or four internal speakers (depending on the model), but can also be connected to an external amplifier.

Compared to the Rhodes piano, the sound from a Wurlitzer is sharper and closer to a sawtooth wave, while the Rhodes' is closer to a sine wave. This gives the Wurlitzer a sharper and punchier tone. When played gently the sound can be sweet and vibraphone-like, sounding similar to the Rhodes; while becoming more aggressive with harder playing, producing a characteristic slightly overdriven tone usually described as a "bark".

Over time, particularly with aggressive playing, the reeds on a Wurlitzer will break through metal fatigue. Any debris between the reed and the pickup can cause a short circuit and produce a burst of distortion.

== History ==
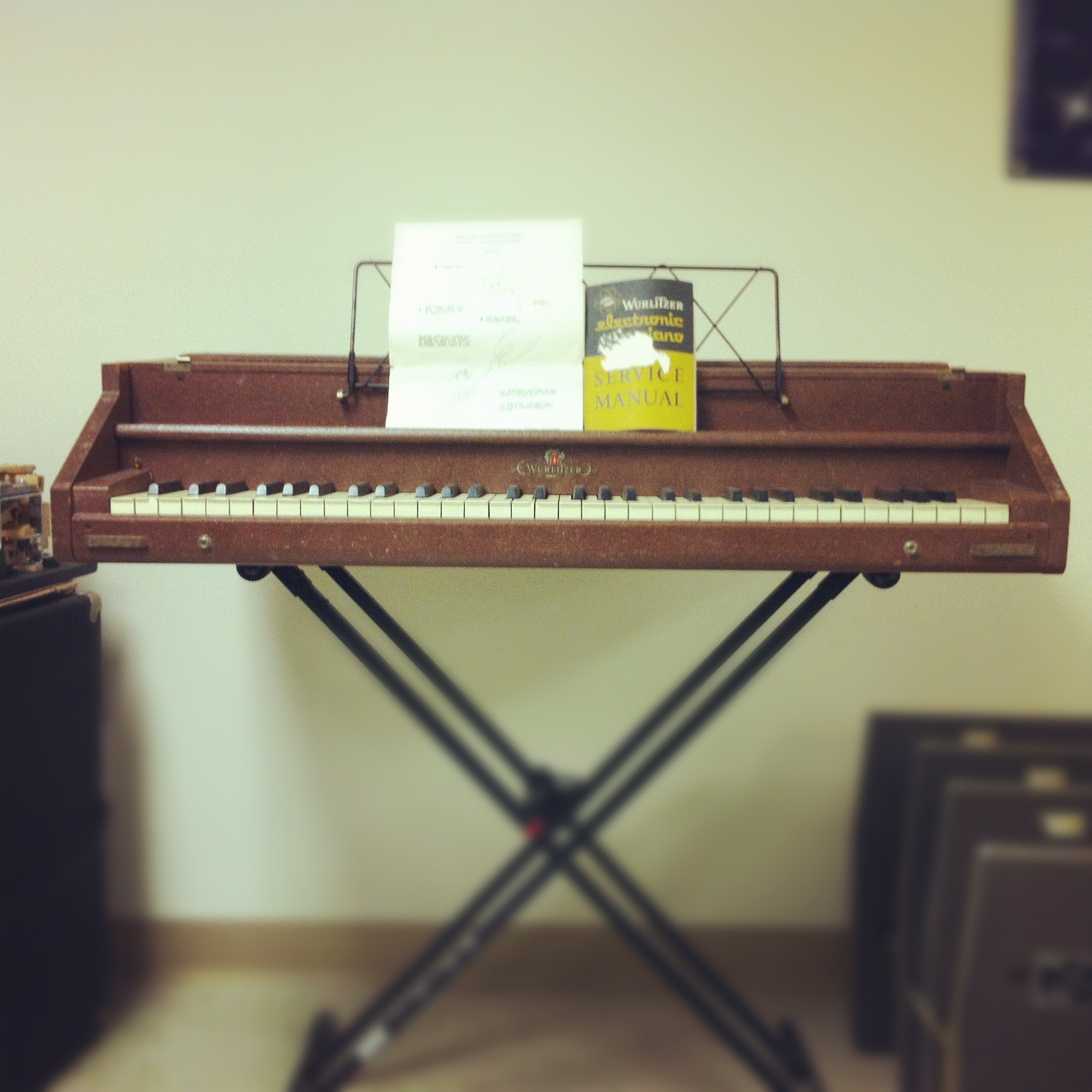
Model 110 Courtesy of Jon Gusoff and Fred DiLeone

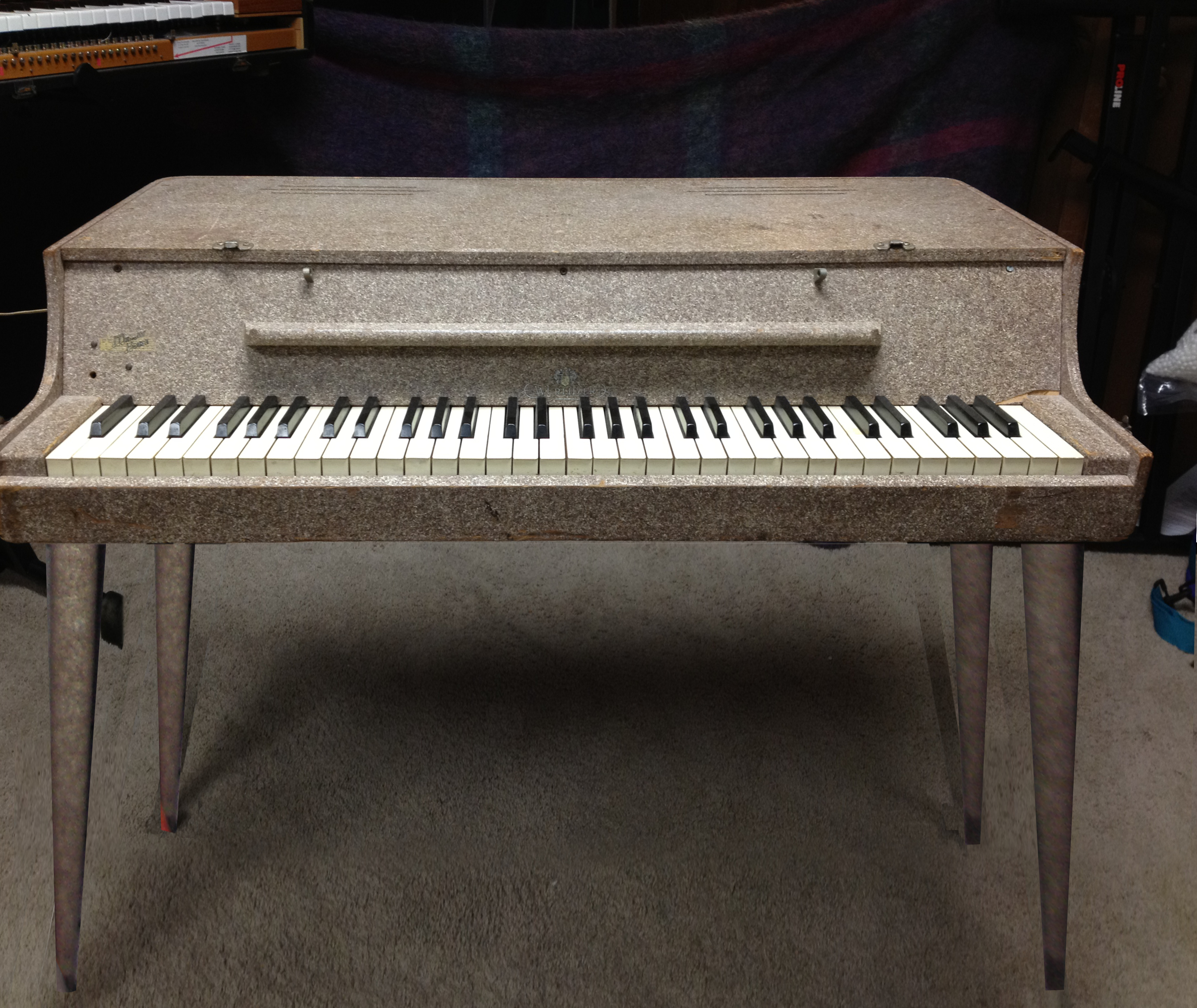
Model 112

Inventor Benjamin Miessner designed an amplified conventional upright piano in the early 1930s by taking an acoustic baby grand and installing an electrostatic pickup system in it. He first demonstrated the instrument in 1932. Four years later, he demonstrated the piano at the NAMM Convention in Chicago. By 1940, Miessner had licensed a patent for his piano design that was used in several electric piano models across the US.

In the early 1950s, Meissner invented a new type of electric piano, substituting strings with struck quarter-inch (6.5 mm) steel reeds. This allowed a much smaller instrument to be manufactured, as it did not need the space to support tension-loaded strings as found on acoustic piano. The reed assembly was designed carefully in order to produce the best set of harmonics when a hammer struck a reed. The lack of acoustic noise meant it could be played quietly using headphones.

The improved model was co-developed in Chicago by Paul Renard and Howard Holman for Wurlitzer. The first model, the 100 was developed in DeKalb Illinois by Clifford Andersen and announced in August 1954 at a trade show in Chicago, with production beginning later that year. The 110 and 111 models were introduced shortly afterward, with the 112 appearing the following year. Early models were built in a small factory in Corinth, Mississippi beginning in November 1954.

In mid-January 1956, Wurlitzer began production at its new 100,000-square-foot (9,300 m^{2}) factory in Corinth dedicated to making these instruments. Various models were made there until 1964, when production expanded to an additional plant in DeKalb, Illinois. Production was later added Wurlitzer's Logan, Utah plant, which closed in September 1981. In the late 1970s, costs were cut in order to increase profitability, as musicians began to use digital synthesizers instead of the Wurlitzer. The last model, the 200A, was discontinued by 1983. In total, around 120,000 instruments were produced. The Corinth factory finally closed in October 1988. Baldwin, who had bought Wurlitzer the previous year, demanded that all of the plant's records, including designs for the electric pianos, be destroyed.

The Wurlitzer was popular with bar bands and amateur musicians, as it allowed pianists to use the same instrument at each gig, instead of having to use whatever instrument happened to be available at the venue. Its relative portability meant it was also a suitable instrument for practice or songwriting.

Wurlitzer published trade advertisements featuring celebrities such as Count Basie, Marian McPartland and Frederick Dvonch. Steve Allen featured in several Wurlitzer advertisements and recorded a series of promotional albums for the company.

== Models ==
Most Wurlitzer pianos are portable, and have removable legs and a sustain pedal attached via a Bowden cable; console, "grand" and "spinet" models were also produced with a permanently attached pedal. The early models' sustain pedals attached through the right side of the instrument, with the pedal eventually being connected directly under the unit in 1956, beginning with the model 112A.

=== Portable models ===
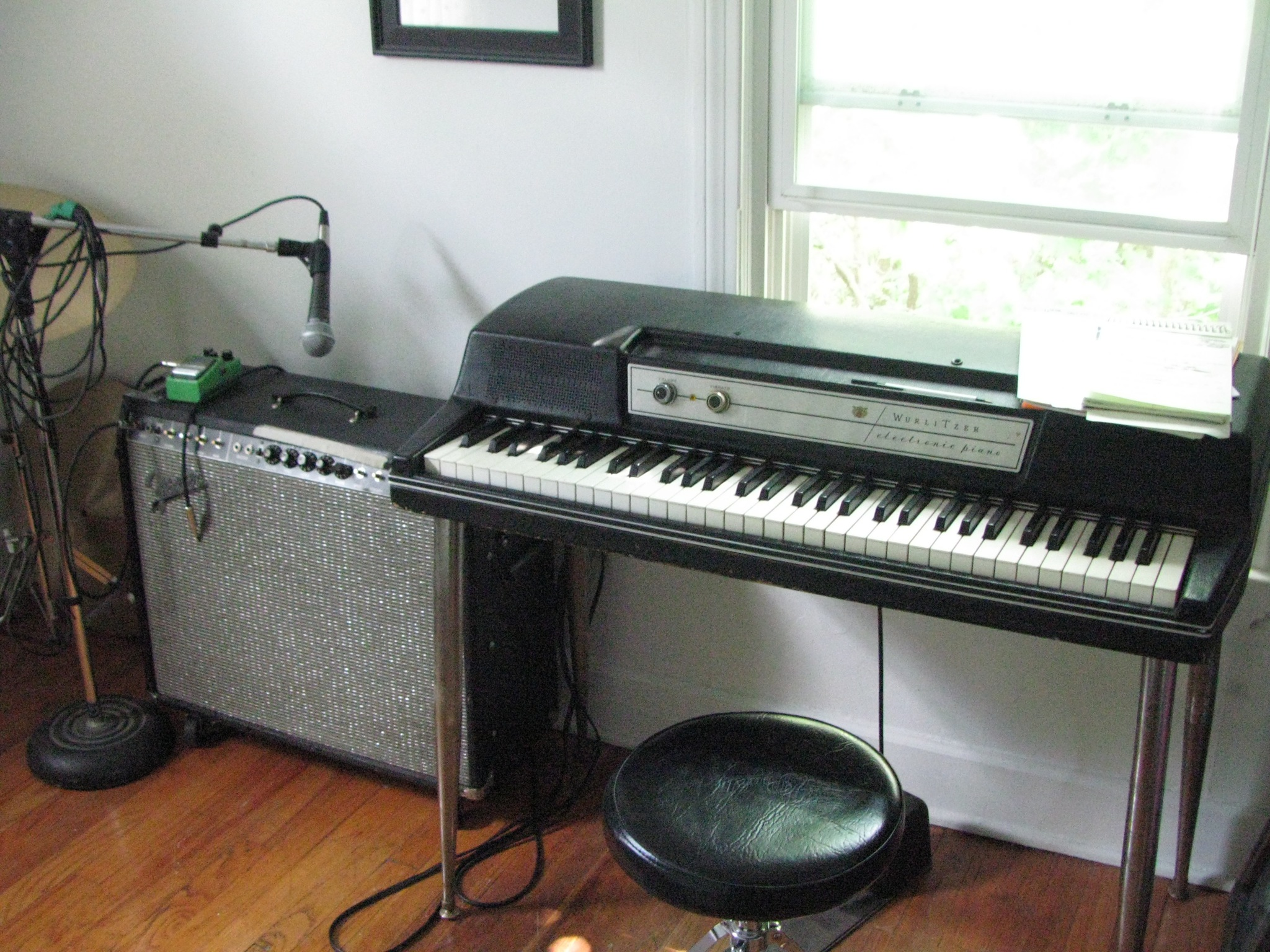
A model 200A next to a guitar amplifier

The earliest versions were the "100" series; these had a case made from painted fibreboard and were fitted with a single loudspeaker mounted in the rear of the case. The 120 was introduced in 1956 with a lighter cabinet, an improved reed system, electromagnetic shielding, and, via an uncommon optional external "tone cabinet" called the 920, a tremolo effect.

The 140 was introduced in 1962. It now included an onboard tremolo, which was incorrectly labelled "vibrato" on the control panel. It had a fixed rate but adjustable depth. Models produced until the early 1960s used vacuum tube circuitry exclusively; the 140 was the first with a transistor amplifier. The model 145 had a tube amplifier and was produced concurrently with the 140. The 145B, the final portable tube model, was phased out in late 1965, while the 140B continued. Around 8,000 140Bs were manufactured. There was a solid-state classroom variant, the 146B, later renamed the 146.

In 1968, the plastic-lidded 200 was introduced, replacing the earlier wooden models. It was a much lighter instrument (56 pounds (25 kg) without the legs or pedal) with a 30 watt amplifier and two loudspeakers facing the player. This helped cut costs as the case could be moulded instead of having to be sawn and joined together. The 200 featured a different keyboard action to earlier models, and a reworked tremolo effect. The instrument's top was hinged at the back, which made it easy to service and repair. It became the most popular Wurlitzer model, with around 88,000 produced. The 200 was available in black, dark "Forest Green", red or beige.

This model was updated as the 200A in 1974 and continued in production into 1983. It featured an improved shield over the reed and pickups to reduce mains hum, which had been a problem with the 200. The last version to be introduced was the 200B in 1978. It was externally identical to the 200A but was designed to be powered by a pair of high-voltage batteries and had no internal amplifier or speakers, in order to reduce hum from the instrument.

=== Console models ===
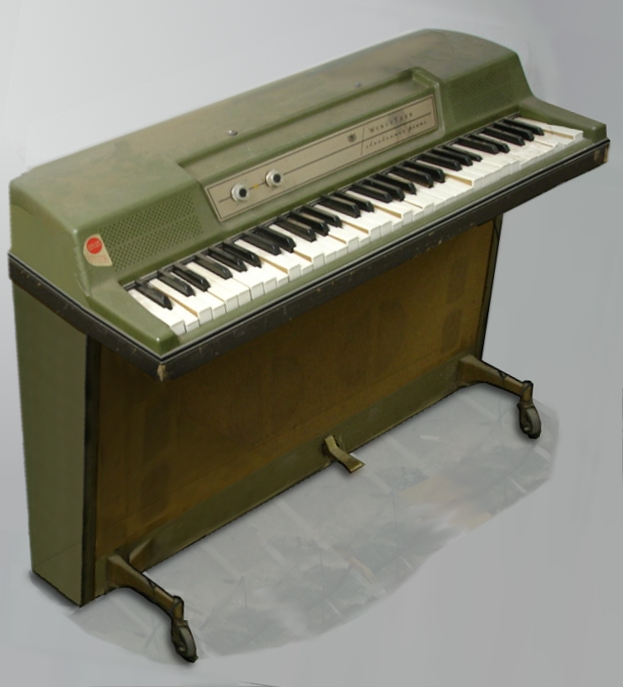
Model 214

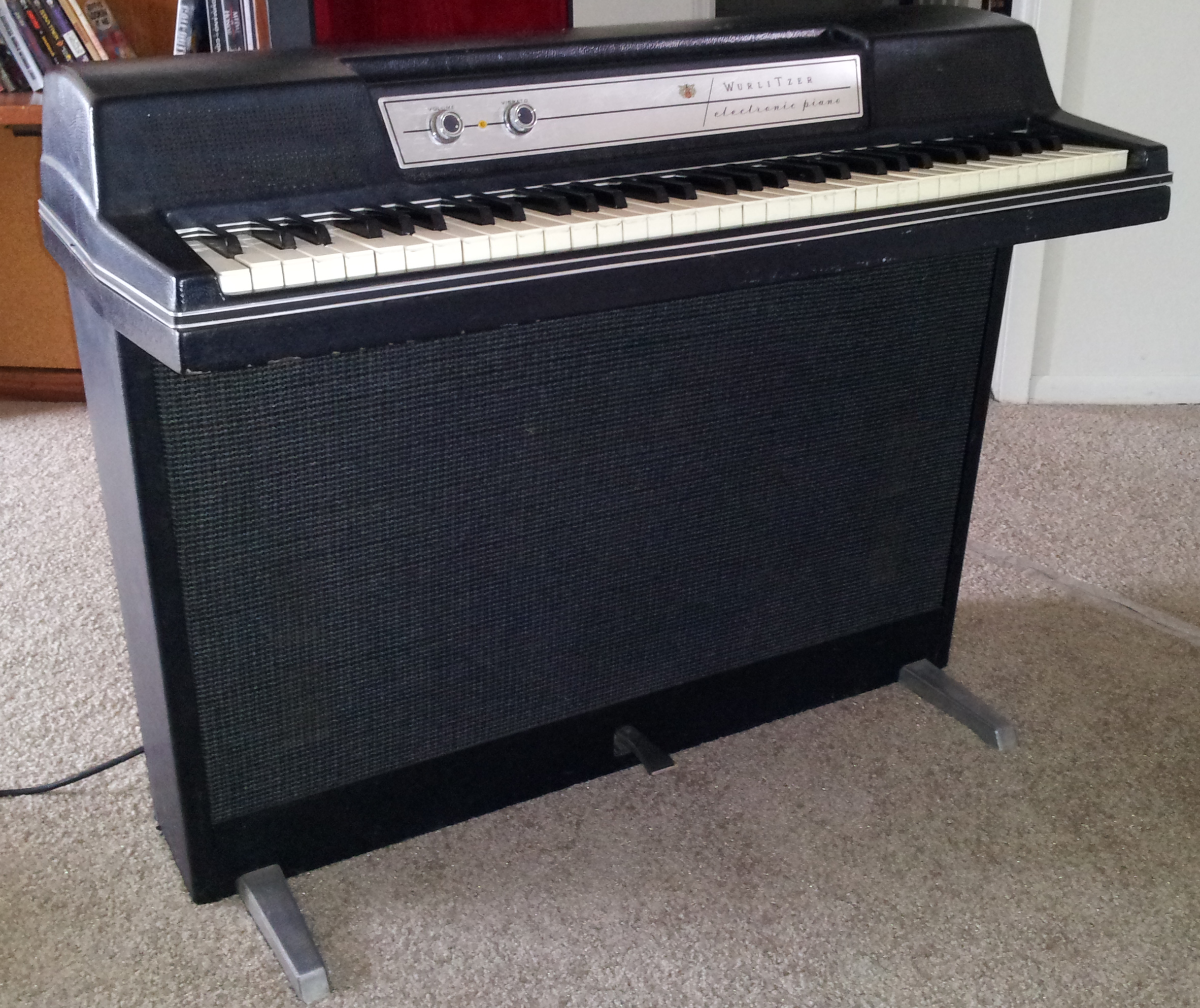
Model 203

One important role for the Wurlitzer piano was as a student instrument in schools and colleges, and non-portable console versions were made for this purpose. The teacher had a headphone and microphone to be able to listen into each student individually and talk to them without others hearing. All students listened to each of their instruments through headphones. Up to 24 individual student instruments could be connected together. According to former Wurlitzer employee Bill Fuller, 75% of all universities used Wurlitzer piano labs in the late 1960s or early 1970s, and some facilities were still in operation as late as 2000.

Most student models resemble a beige or light green Model 200 mounted on a matching pedestal containing a loudspeaker, headphone niche and sustain pedal. There is no tremolo (although earlier models simply have the facility disabled). Some of these models were given the designation 206/206A. Rarer than the student models are the teacher consoles such as 205V and 207, featuring multiple monitor/mute switches and, in some cases the facility to add a large illuminated display panel ("Key Note Visualizer") operated via the keyboard. Standalone classroom consoles were the 214/215 series, and home/stage consoles were the 203, 203W and 210. An unusual, angular version was the 300, only available in Europe around early 1973.

==== 106P ====
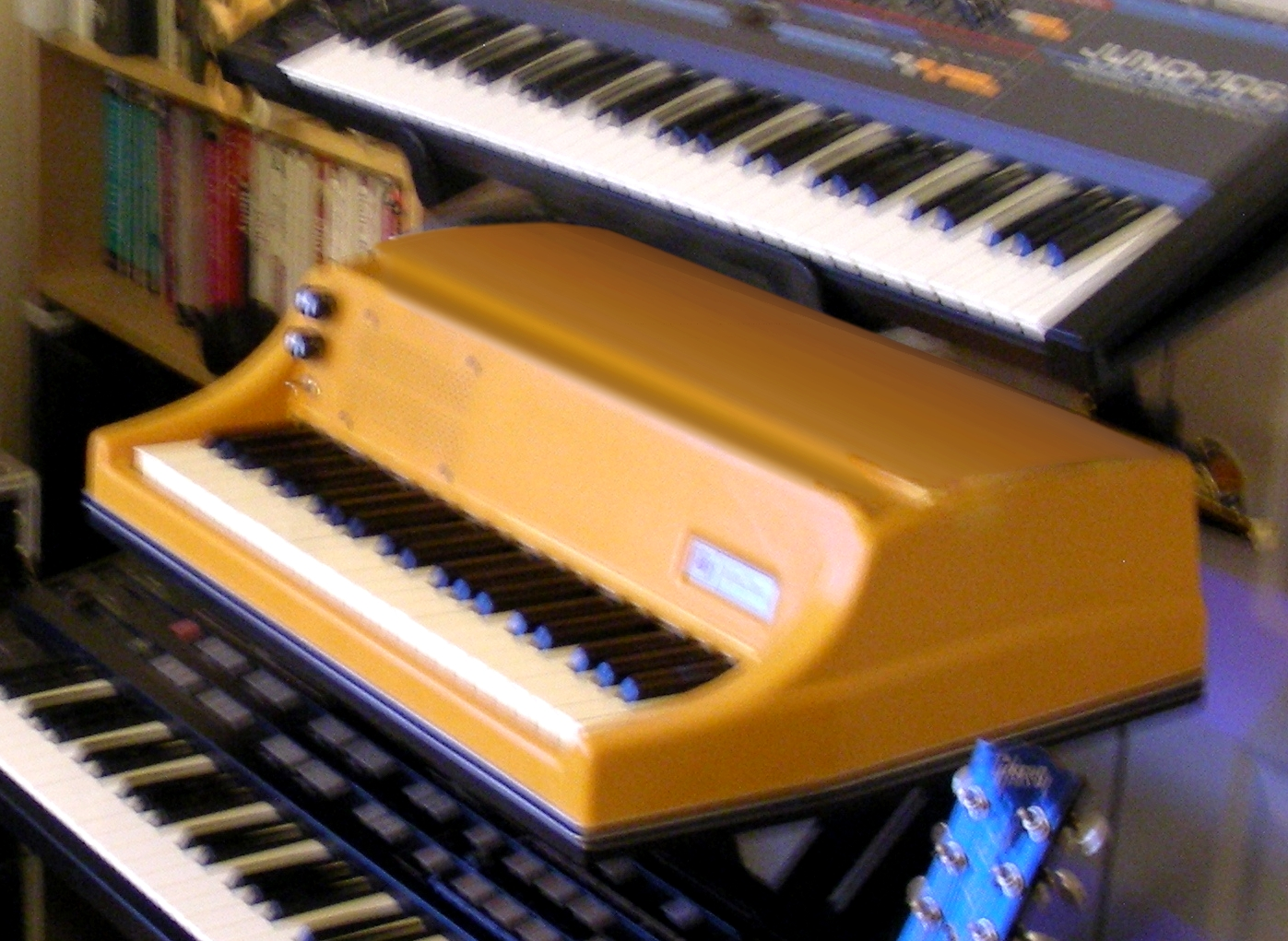
Model 106 classroom piano.
Note: Two knobs on the left are not the originals.

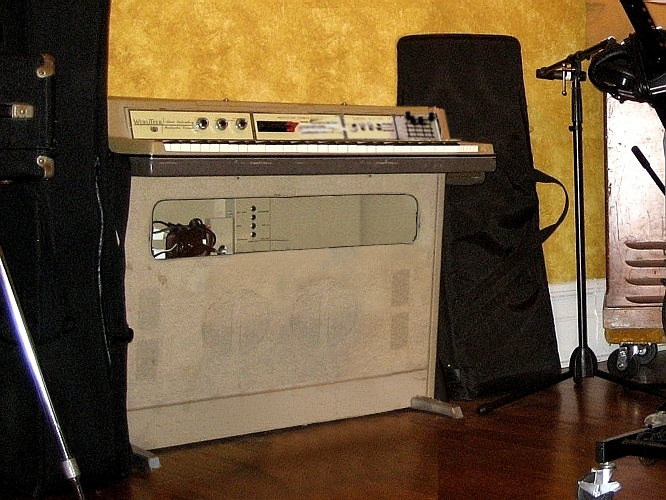
Model 207 teacher's console for music labs.

A rare version, and the only known model not to have 64 keys is the 106P (P for "Pupil"), a 44-note classroom model with a plastic case, no controls, one loudspeaker and no sustain pedal. The 106P was available as a set of eight on a folding frame, forming a portable keyboard lab. They were attached by a cable to a full-size teacher piano with controls to feature each pupil piano. This model appears to date from the early 1970s and was available in orange or beige. Page McConnell, of the rock band Phish, has played a customized 106P with an additional vibration circuit.

=== Other models ===
Since production began, small numbers of wood-cased spinet-style instruments were made for domestic use. The model 700 was the same amplifier and action as the portable 120, and featured a 12-inch (300 mm) internal speaker that emphasized bass frequencies better. The longer-keyed model 720 was the spinet version of the 145 tube model.

The 200A had a domestic sister model 270 called the "Butterfly Baby Grand", a semicircular, walnut finish wooden-cased piano with twin quadrant-shaped lids angled above horizontally mounted 8" loudspeakers.

== Maintenance ==
The most common maintenance and service task on a Wurlitzer is replacing broken reeds. In order to sound the correct pitch, each reed has a blob of solder on the end, which must be filed off to produce the right weight. Reeds have elongated screw holes, which allows fine tuning by moving it backward and forward in the assembly before fastening. It is still possible to buy spare reeds, or take them from another instrument that has broken. A further issue is debris between a reed and the pickup causing distortion or pops. The easiest way to fix this is to repeatedly press each key in order to dislodge the dirt. Failing that, a more comprehensive solution is to open the instrument up and spray compressed air at the affected area.

In contrast, Wurlitzer purposefully over-engineered the piano action, as it was designed to resemble that of an acoustic piano to help teaching. Unlike the hammers on a Rhodes, which can develop unwanted grooves from over-hitting, the action on a Wurlitzer has been seen to operate well into the 21st century.

== Clones ==
The Wurlitzer is emulated in several modern digital keyboards, though its electromechanical sound production is difficult to emulate in a synthesized instrument. The Korg SV1 has been critically praised for its accurate emulation of a Wurlitzer. The Nord Stage includes the emulation of a Wurlitzer.

In 2012, Arturia released the Wurlitzer V, a Virtual Studio Technology (VST) software emulation of the original instrument. In 2024, Cherry Audio released the Wurlybird 140B, a virtual instrument modeled after the Wurly 140B. Apple's Logic Pro X includes an emulation of a Wurlitzer 200A.

== Key releases ==
Image	Model name / number	Years produced	Description
	100	1954	Pilot product. No more than 50 were made, if that. Only known from archival marketing photographs.
	110	1954–1955	Test-marketed portable model.
	112	1955–1956	First mass-produced portable Wurlitzer.
	112A	1956	Sustain pedal attaches underneath the instrument, as opposed to the side on earlier models. Redesigned Pratt-Read action.
	120	1956–1962	First model to feature tremolo (in external optional amp, the 920).
	140, pre-A, A and B variants.	1962–1968	First to feature a solid-state amplifier. First model to feature internal tremolo ("vibrato"). Action redesign.
	200 (pre-A and A variants)	1968–1983	The most popular models produced. Plastic-topped. Lighter, more portable, more compact. Dual speakers.
	206/207/214 (pre-A and A variants)	1968–1983	Student, Teacher and standalone "Classroom" models

== Notable users ==
Jazz pianist Sun Ra was one of the first to release recordings using the instrument, on 1956 singles later compiled on his album Angels and Demons at Play. Ray Charles began playing a Wurlitzer, as he preferred to take a portable instrument with him instead of using whatever piano was at a venue; his 1959 hit "What'd I Say" featured the model 120 prominently. Joe Zawinul borrowed Charles' Wurlitzer for a gig backing Dinah Washington, and liked the instrument enough to buy his own model. He played a model 140B on "Mercy, Mercy, Mercy," his 1966 hit with the Cannonball Adderley Quintet. Spooner Oldham used a 140B Wurlitzer on Aretha Franklin's 1967 single "I Never Loved a Man (The Way I Love You)", playing a riff that runs through the whole song, while Earl Van Dyke played one on Marvin Gaye's "I Heard It Through the Grapevine". The Small Faces used a 140B Wurlitzer on "Lazy Sunday".

The instrument was used extensively by British band Supertramp in the 1970s, in songs such as "The Logical Song", "Goodbye Stranger" and "Dreamer". Queen's John Deacon played a Wurlitzer on their hit "You're My Best Friend", and Pink Floyd's Richard Wright played one on "Money". Part of the iconic sound of the early Carpenters' hits was Richard Carpenter's Wurlitzer electronic piano.

Eddie Van Halen played a Wurlitzer through an MXR flanger and Marshall amplifier on "And the Cradle Will Rock..." on Van Halen's 1980 album Women and Children First. Norah Jones has regularly used a Wurlitzer on stage. Her preferred model is a 206 (a student version of the 200) repainted in a deep-red finish.
