= W. Otto Miessner =

American composer and music educator (1880–1967)

- Born: May 26, 1880
- Died: May 27, 1967 (aged 87)
- Parent(s): Charles Miessner and Mary Miessner

William Otto Miessner (May 26, 1880 - May 27, 1967) was an American composer and music educator. Most of his life was spent in the midwest, particularly Indiana and Wisconsin.

== Life and career ==
Born in Huntingburg, Indiana, Miessner was the son of Charles Miessner and Mary Miessner (née Reutepohler) and the older brother of Benjamin Franklin Miessner. He graduated from Huntingburg High School in 1898. He earned a diploma from the Cincinnati Conservatory of Music, where he studied music theory with A. J. Gantvoort, piano with Frederick Hoffman, and singing with Adolph Devin-Duvivier. He later pursued further studies in New York with Frederick Bristol (singing), A. J. Goodrich (harmony and counterpoint), and Edgar Stillman Kelley (composition). He also studied voice in Berlin, taking lessons in 1910 with Alexander Heinemann. He then taught music from 1900 until 1904 at a school in Boonville, Indiana, before going to Connersville to teach elementary and high school music; he stayed there from 1905 until 1909. Miessner has been quoted as saying that "The idle mind is the devil’s workshop. But this is my workshop and I’ll not tolerate an idle mind as long as there’s excitement in music."

One day in 1906, Miessner met three students in the street; they had been suspended from school earlier in the day due to misbehavior. The three were watching a minstrel show, keeping time with their hands while listening. Miessner made a deal with the three boys: he would get them reinstated in school if they, in exchange, would learn to play instruments in a school band which he was at the time planning to form. They agreed; Miessner, for his part, encouraged them to practice by promising them a public concert and uniforms in the school colors. The experiment was a success, and Connersville High School became possessed of the first public high school band in the United States. Miessner received a great deal of exposure for his work in starting the band, which was chosen to perform at a convention of the Northern and Southern Indiana Teacher's Association in 1908. This performance received a notice in School Music, at the time a national publication for music educators, and Miessner's name was made.

Miessner went on to serve in a number of teaching and administrative positions during the remainder of his career. He was the director of the music schools of Milwaukee State Teachers College from 1914 until 1922, and from 1911 until 1924 taught at summer sessions at Northwestern University. He founded the Miessner Institute of Music in Milwaukee in 1924. In the early 1930s he worked with his brother, Benjamin, to invent an instrument called a rhythmicon. Unfortunately for them, Léon Theremin had already developed a similar instrument with the same name. In 1936 he became head of the Department of Music Education at the University of Kansas, where he headed the graduate studies program and remained until 1945. In addition, he co-edited music textbooks for Silver Burdett for forty years and served ten years as president of the Miessner Piano Company in Milwaukee. He also received many honors for his work as an educator, including honorary doctorates from the Cincinnati Conservatory and Chicago Musical College. He was a life member of the Music Educators National Conference, whose president he was from 1923 until 1924; he was also a member of Phi Delta Kappa, Phi Mu Alpha Sinfonia, and Pi Kappa Lambda. While in Boonville, he also served as a music director for a number of local organizations, including the Methodist church. In 1986 he was inducted into the Music Educators National Conference Hall of Fame.

Upon his retirement, Miessner returned to Connersville. Upon learning that no music teacher could be found for some of the local schools, he obtained an emergency permit that allowed him to return to teaching for three years, beginning in 1956. He was then told that he would have to take a beginners' course in teaching to retain his permit; feeling that his experience as a teacher should exempt him from such work, he declined. He died in Connersville in 1967.

Miessner is primarily remembered as an educator, but he wrote music as well. Most of his music was composed for choir, but he also wrote songs as well as some pieces for piano. He also wrote pedagogical works for beginning violinists and pianists, and compiled teaching materials about symphonic music and American songs.
