= Cathcart Cemetery =

Cemetery in East Renfrewshire, Scotland

Coordinates: 55°48′32″N 4°15′54″W

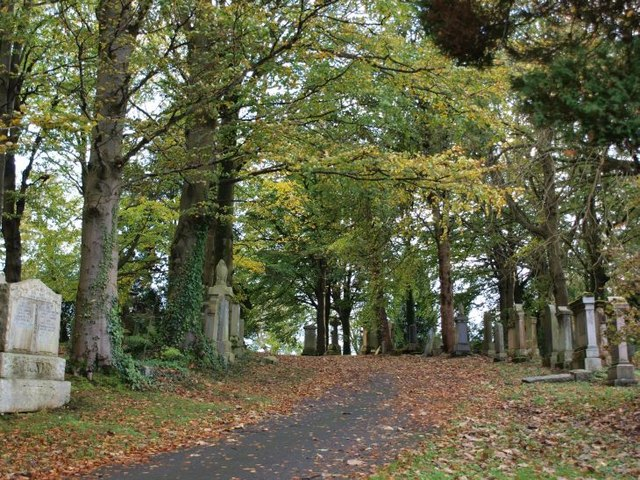
Cathcart Cemetery

Cathcart Cemetery is a cemetery in East Renfrewshire, Scotland, which was opened in 1876 . It is named after the nearby neighbourhood of Cathcart on the southern outskirts of Glasgow, but does not actually fall within the city boundaries, instead being a salient of East Renfrewshire. It is bounded to the east by the White Cart Water, with Linn Park on the opposite bank. Other surrounding residential areas to the west are Muirend and Netherlee. The grounds of Holmwood House, a mansion designed by Alexander 'Greek' Thomson, are located a short distance to the north.

Cathcart is a garden cemetery and is divided into two sections, the older section and the newer Linn extension, divided by Netherlee Road. There are war graves in both sections; a total of 247 Commonwealth service personnel of both World Wars are buried here. There is also a Jewish section.

The cemetery contains the William and Mary Hood mausoleum, which is based upon the Philae Temple of Hathor. The cemetery gatehouse had been derelict for ten years until it was restored as a family home, winning a Glasgow Institute of Architects Design Award in 2011.

The cemetery (excluding some modern additions and alterations) was designated a Category C listed building by Historic Environment Scotland in January 2026.

== Notable burials ==
- Bashir Ahmad (1940–2009), First Scottish–Asian MSP
- Hannah Frank (1908–2008), Scottish artist and sculptor
- Margaret Jefferson (1860–1908), English actress, mother of Stan Laurel
- Hugh MacColl (1861–1915), Scottish man who founded Sevilla Fútbol Club being their first captain in 1890
- Jessie MacLachlan (1866–1916), Scottish Gaelic soprano
- Mark Sheridan (1864–1918), English music hall comedian and singer
- Eric Woolfson (1945–2009), Scottish songwriter and musician; co-creator of The Alan Parsons Project
- Solomon Wolfson (1865-1941), patriarch of the Wolfson Family
