= Myrna Sharlow =

American opera singer (1893-1952)

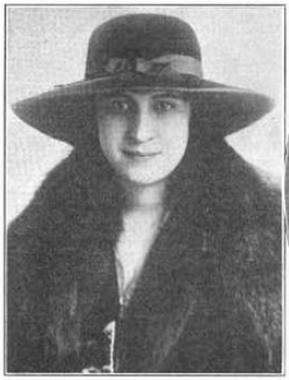
Myrna Sharlow, from a 1918 publication.

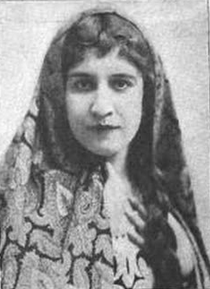
Myrna Sharlow in 1920 as Micaela in Carmen.

Myrna Docia Sharlow (19 July 1893 – 14 August 1952) was an American soprano who had an active performance career in operas and concerts during the 1910s through the 1930s. She began her career in 1912 with the Boston Opera Company and became one of Chicago's more active sopranos from 1915–1920, and again in 1923–1924 and 1926–1927. She sang with several other important American opera companies during her career, including one season at the Metropolitan Opera. She made only a handful of opera appearances in Europe during her career, most notably singing in the English premiere of Riccardo Zandonai's Francesca da Rimini at Covent Garden in 1914. Her repertoire spanned a wide range from leading dramatic soprano roles to lighter lyric soprano fair and comprimario parts. She even performed a few roles traditionally sung by mezzo-sopranos or contraltos.

== Early life and education ==
Born in Jamestown, North Dakota, Sharlow moved with her family at a young age to St. Louis, Missouri. Her father worked variously as a school teacher, river boatman, and policeman. She studied piano with Marcus Epstem in St. Louis and for two years studied singing with Ferdinand Jaeger at the Beethoven Conservatory of Music in St. Louis. She also studied dramatic acting at the Perry School of Oratory and foreign languages at the Berlitz School in Saint Louis. She then studied in New York City with Frederick Bristol while beginning her opera career in Boston.

== Early career in Boston ==
Sharlow made her professional opera debut in Boston in 1912 at the age of 19 with the Boston Opera Company (BOC) as Musetta in Giacomo Puccini's La bohème. She was also heard that year as Stella and the voice of Antonia's mother in The Tales of Hoffmann. The following year she performed in several more soubrette and comprimario roles with the BOC. She had her first major triumph in Boston in March 1914 when she replaced an ailing Nellie Melba as Mimi in La bohème at the last minute. Melba herself stayed in the wings to encourage the young singer and prompt her between scenes about the correct blocking. Her performance was given glowing reviews in the Globe the following day. The BOC went bankrupt in early 1915, and Sharlow was forced to seek employment elsewhere. However, she did return to Boston in 1916 to sing the title role in Georges Bizet's Carmen in concert with the Boston Symphony Orchestra and tenor Arthur Hackett as her Don José.

== Work in Europe and Chicago ==
In the spring of 1914 Sharlow made her European debut in Paris as Cio-Cio-San in Puccini's Madama Butterfly with Henry Russell's opera company in that city. She was also heard there as Santuzza in Cavalleria rusticana. She also made appearances that year at the Paris Opera and the Berlin State Opera. In July 1914 she sang at the Royal Opera House in London in the English premiere of Riccardo Zandonai's Francesca da Rimini. The Times stated in their review, "A special word of praise seems due to Miss Myrna Sharlow, who as Samaritana sang with an appealing freshness in her duet in the first act." In September 1914 she made her New York City debut performing in one of the Century Opera Company's Sunday Night Concerts with Alexander Smallens accompanying her on the piano.

In 1915 Sharlow made a lauded debut with the Chicago Grand Opera Company as Puccini's Mimi, but the company folded soon after. From 1916-1920 she was committed to the Chicago Opera Association (COA) where she performed Aline in Xavier Leroux's Le chemineau, Clotilde in Vincenzo Bellini's Norma Ermyntrude in Pietro Mascagni's Isabeau, Marguerite in Charles Gounod's Faust Micaëla in Bizet's Carmen, Meg Page in Giuseppe Verdi's Falstaff, Sophie in Jules Massenet's Werther, and Urbain in Giacomo Meyerbeer's Les Huguenots. In January 1916 she created the role of Sylvia in the world premiere of Simon Bucharoff's The Lover's Knot for the COA.

In 1919 Sharlow was heard at Ravinia Park with the Chicago Symphony Orchestra as all four soprano heroines in The Tales of Hoffmann and as Musetta to the Mimi of Florence Easton. After a three-year absence from the Chicago stage, she performed the roles of Brangäne in Richard Wagner's Tristan und Isolde and Brunnhilde in Wagner's Siegfried with the Chicago Civic Opera in 1923. She was heard in Chicago and on tour with the Civic Opera in 1924 as Octavie in Massenet's Cléopâtre with Mary Garden in the title role. In 1926 she was the soprano soloist in Handel's Messiah with the Apollo Club. She returned to Ravinia in 1927 to sing the title role in Charpentier's Louise.

== Later career ==
In 1920 Sharlow returned to the Boston Opera House in Gustave Charpentier's Louise with Mary Garden in the title role. Having upstaged Garden in a performance of a secondary role, The Boston Globe's review of the performance was bi-lined "Myrna Sharlow Makes Hit in Minor Role". She returned to Boston again in 1923 to sing Gounod's Marguerite. In 1921 she was heard in concerts with the Detroit Symphony and the Minneapolis Symphony Orchestra, and in concert with the University of California, Berkeley's orchestra and chorus as the soprano soloist in Gioachino Rossini's Stabat Mater under conductor Paul Steindorff. That same year she married Captain E. B. Hitchcock.

In 1927 Sharlow toured North America with the San Carlo Grand Opera Company as Gounod's Marguerite and Puccini's Mimi. In 1928 she was committed to the Pennsylvania Grand Opera Company where she performed Maddalena di Coigny in Andrea Chénier and the title heroines in Aida and Tosca. In 1929 she sang several roles with the Cincinnati Opera and the Baltimore Opera Company, including Leonora in Verdi's Il trovatore with both companies. That same year she appeared at the Biltmore Theater in New York City as Aida. She also sang with the Columbia Grand Opera Company in Los Angeles and other cities on the West Coast of the United States during the late 1920s.

Sharlow was committed to the Metropolitan Opera in the 1930-31 season, making her debut with the company on November 27, 1930, as Nedda in Ruggero Leoncavallo's Pagliacci with Giovanni Martinelli as Canio and Giuseppe De Luca as Tonio. Her only other role with the company was Aida, which she sang to Martinelli's Radamès and Julia Claussen's Amneris with Tullio Serafin conducting. She was also a soloist in a Holiday concert at the Metropolitan Opera House on November 30, 1930, and sang the aria Pace, pace, mio Dio from Verdi's La Forza del Destino at a Gala concert at the Met on January 4, 1931.

In 1932 Sharlow appeared in concert with Frederick Jagel at Town Hall in New York City. In 1933 she sang Marguerite and Santuzza under conductor Ernst Knoch for WOR (AM). In 1935 she gave some of her last performances in concerts with the Boston Pops Orchestra. She taught on the voice faculty of Millikin University from 1923-1925.
