= The Tanks That Broke the Ranks Out in Picardy =

Single by Fanning & Fortune
- B-side: "Take Me Back To Dear Old Blighty"
- Released: 1916
- Label: A. W. Gamage Record
- Songwriters: Harry Castling; Harry Carlton

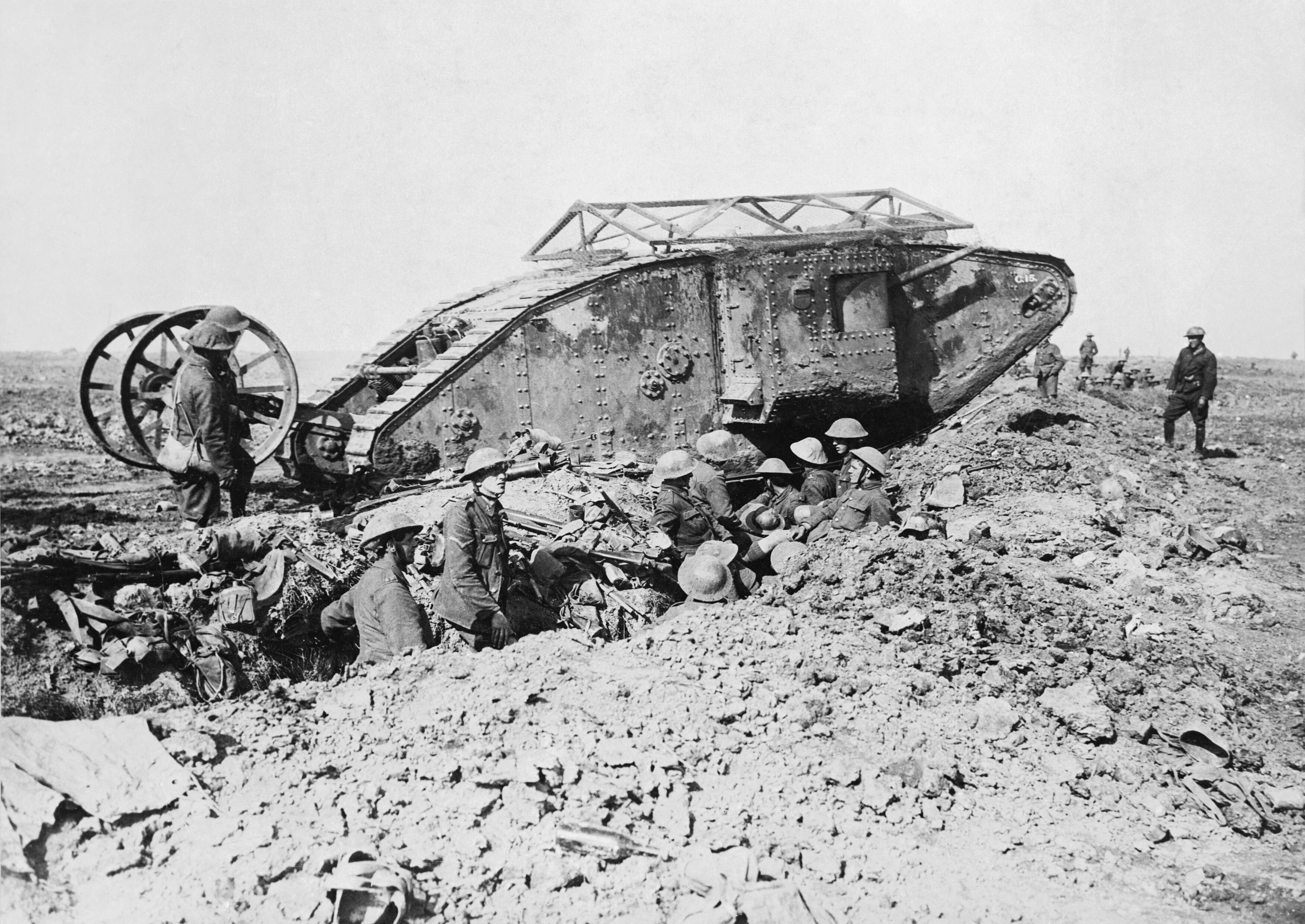
A British Mark I "male" tank near Thiepval, 25 September 1916. Probably in reserve for the Battle of Thiepval Ridge, which began the next day, part of the Battle of the Somme.

The Tanks That Broke the Ranks Out in Picardy (also known by the shorter title of The Tanks That Broke the Ranks) is a 1916 song written jointly by Harry Castling and Harry Carlton.

== Overview ==
The song celebrated the introduction of the tank which was first used by the British in 1916 as part of the Battle of the Somme.

The song tells the story of a brigade of tanks on the Western Front, passing obstacles with ease. It references many prominent German military leaders of the day, including Kaiser Wilhelm, Alfred von Tirpitz, Paul von Hindenburg and Prince Wilhelm. It is written to the jaunty tune of a music hall hit of a few years earlier, "The Man Who Broke the Bank at Monte Carlo".

The song was popular during Christmas pantomime performances at the end of 1916.
