= Charles W. Harrison =

American singer (1878–1965)

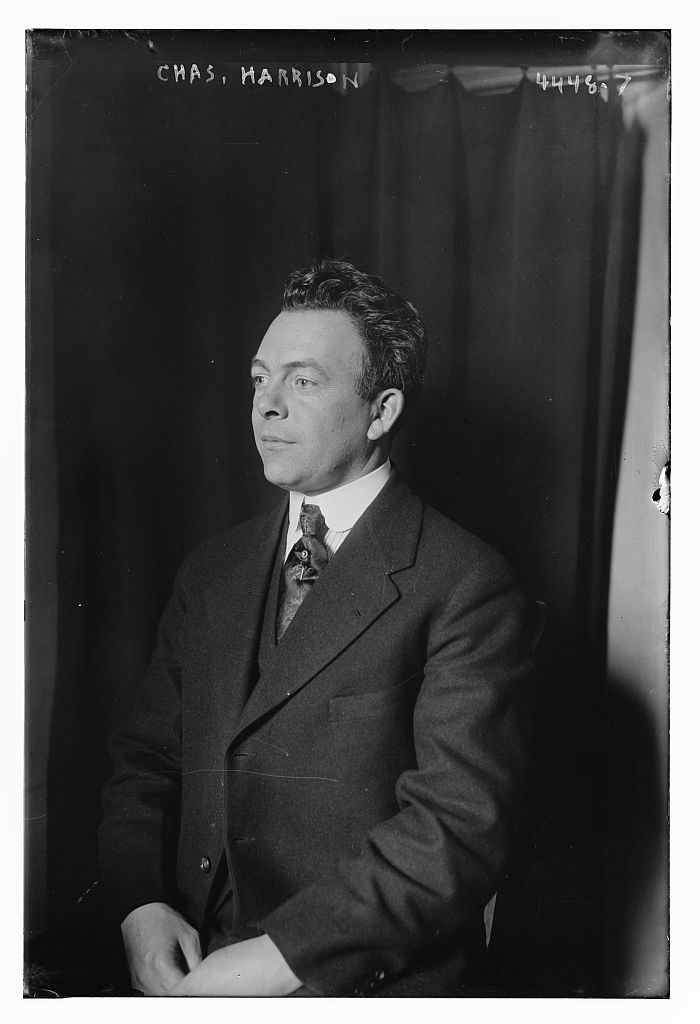
Harrison in 1918

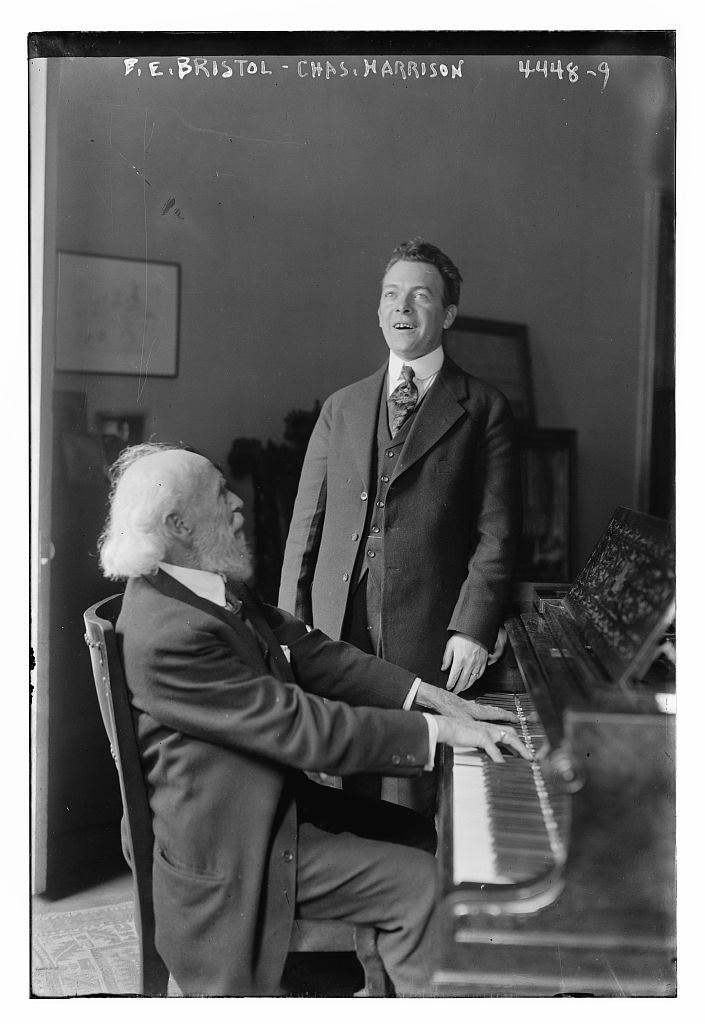
Charles W. Harrison and Frederick Bristol in 1918 in New York City

Charles William Harrison (September 11, 1878 – February 2, 1965) was an American tenor ballad singer. He recorded under the pseudonyms: Hugh Donovan, Billy Burton, Charles Hilton, and Norman Terrell.

== Biography ==
Charles W. Harrison and soprano Agnes Kimball perform the "Miserere" from Verdi's Il trovatore. 1913, Edison Records.

He was born on September 11, 1878, in Jersey City, New Jersey, United States.

Harrison studied singing in New York City with voice teacher Frederick Bristol and organist Leo Koffler. He began recording for the Columbia Phonograph Company, his first disc being the "Cujus animam" aria from Gioachino Rossini's Stabat Mater, recorded on January 31, 1911, and issued on Columbia 12-inch disc A5275. He recorded an extensive operatic and concert song repertoire in English for Columbia, Victor, Edison (on both cylinder and disc), Emerson and other companies, but gradually shifted to making recordings of popular hits of the day: "Last Night Was the End of the World" (1913), "Peg O’ My Heart" (1913), "Ireland Must Be Heaven, for My Mother Came from There" (1916), and "I’m Always Chasing Rainbows" (1918).

At the same time as his solo performances, he performed as a member of several quartets recording for Columbia. Among the quartets, he sang with was the Columbia Stellar Quartet and the American Singers, the latter during the early electric era. Also on a few occasions, he sang with the Revelers, most notably on their recordings of "Honolulu Moon" and "Yankee Girl." His distinct and riveting tenor caused Victor Records to advertise him as "a voice in a million." His career slowed with the advent of electrical recording, and his later solo records were almost entirely for Edison.

Charles Harrison was married to Beulah Gaylord Young, another pioneer recording artist. They performed together as members of the Eveready Mixed Quartet on The Eveready Hour.

Beginning in 1930, Harrison performed on the Broadway stage in the plays This One Man, Precedent, The Sellout and One More Honeymoon.

He lived in Summit, New Jersey, and later moved to nearby New Providence, where he spent his final years, and even recorded an LP in 1954 at the age of 75 entitled "Charles Harrison Sings Again." Charles Harrison recorded mostly under his own name, but he also used Billy Burton and other pseudonyms when recording for smaller labels.

He died on February 2, 1965, in New Providence, New Jersey.
