= Harry Castling =

English lyricist (1865–1933)

Henry Castling (19 April 1865 – 26 December 1933) was an English lyricist of music hall songs.

== Biography ==
Castling was born in Newington, London, the son of a street musician. He began writing songs in the 1890s, often collaborating on both comic and sentimental songs with Arthur J. Mills. They had their first success with "What-Ho! She Bumps" (1899), sung by Charles Bignall, followed by "Just Like the Ivy" (1902), performed by Marie Kendall. By 1907, he had started to collaborate with another writer, Fred Godfrey, on songs such as "I'll Tell Tilly On The Telephone" (1907), "Meet Me, Jennie, When The Sun Goes Down" (1907), "I Want You to See My Girl" (1908), and "Take Me Back to Yorkshire" (1910), which was later used by Noël Coward in his 1933 film Cavalcade.

One of Castling's biggest successes was "Let's All Go Down the Strand" (1910), written with C. W. Murphy. He also wrote "Are We To Part Like This, Bill?" (1912) with Charles Collins; "The Tanks That Broke the Ranks Out in Picardy" (1916) with Harry Carlton; and, several years later, "Don't Have Any More, Mrs. Moore" (1926), written with James Walsh and performed successfully by Lily Morris.

Castling became destitute in his later years. He died in Camberwell in 1933, aged 68.
