= Charlie Case =

American comedian (1858–1916)

- Born: August 27, 1858
- Died: November 26, 1916 (aged 58); New York City, New York, USA
- Spouse: Charlotte

Comedy career
- Medium: Vaudeville

Charley Case (August 27, 1858 – November 26, 1916) was an American vaudeville performance artist who delivered the first known example of stand-up comedy in the late 1880s. He performed humorous monologues directly to the audience while standing in one spot without props or costumes. He is credited with creating the term "punchline" as he often used his arms in a punch-line motion during his stories. Case also wrote and sang vaudeville parodies of the 19th-century ballad style. He influenced F. Gregory Hartswick, who wrote similar songs.

Case is thought to have been mulatto. He started his career as a blackface comedian in America, but switched to a monologue format without props. Little official documentation of his personal history is available, but there are reports that he was mixed and sought to "pass". It was not uncommon at the time for African-Americans to perform in blackface as a loophole into the entertainment business.

In 1910, after recovering from a nervous breakdown, he went on tour in England, where for the first time he performed the song "There was once a poor young man who left his country home." The 1933 film The Fatal Glass of Beer is based on this song, and comedian W. C. Fields performs it at the onset. Critic Harold Bloom remarked several years later that Fields, "croaking his ghastly dirge to the uncertain sound of his dulcimer, is a parodic version of the Bard of Sensibility, a figure out of the primitivism of Thomas Gray or William Blake."

== Style ==
According to Sigmund Spaeth, in his 1926 book, Read 'Em and Weep: The Songs You Forgot to Remember, the interpreter of a Case song would sing in a "very matter-of-fact voice, with little or no expression, letting the words speak for themselves." Case is also sometimes credited with being one of the first to employ the stand-up style when, in the 1880s and 90s, he began to do comedic monologues without props or costumes, something that had never been done before.

In 1906, The Indianapolis Star wrote that, "He is of a quiet and retiring disposition when off the stage, and to see him on the street or at his hotel one would never take him for a comedian who makes thousands laugh every season." That year the Toledo Blade called him "one of the funniest monologue comedians in the business."

== Death ==
He died on November 26, 1916, at the Palace Hotel on 45th Street in New York. Another vaudevillian reported that Case shot himself and that his dying words were "Pardon me." The police were told that a bottle of oil and a cleaning cloth were on the floor, evidence that he had accidentally killed himself while cleaning his gun. However, Spaeth wrote that, "Case's untimely death was supposedly due to the accidental explosion of a gun that he was cleaning, but it is generally recognized in the theatrical profession that he shot himself. Mixed blood was the chief reason." He was known for a quiet, shy, and brooding nature.

His wife Charlotte is said to have died from a heart attack upon hearing the news.

== Music ==
Lyrics to two of Charley Case's songs:

"There was once a poor young man who left his country home,
And came to the city to seek employment;
He promised his dear mother that he'd lead the simple life,
And always shun the fatal curse of drink.

He came to the city and accepted employment in a quarry,
And while there he made the acquaintance of some college men;
He little guessed that they were demons, for they wore the best of clothes,
But clothes do not always make the gentleman.

One night he went out with his new-found friends to dine,
And they tried to persuade him to take a drink;
They tempted him and tempted him, but he refused and he refused,
Till finally he took a glass of beer.

When he seen what he had done he dashed the liquor to the floor,
And he staggered through the door with delirium tremens;
While in the grip of liquor he met a Salvation Army lassie,
And cruelly he broke her tambourine.

All she said was 'Heaven bless you!' and placed a mark upon his brow,
With a kick that she had learned before she was saved;
So kind friends, take my advice and shun the fatal curse of drink,
And don't go around breaking people's tambourines."

And

"There was once a poor young girl who left her country home,
And came to the city to seek employment;
She had to leave her home because the wolf was at the door,
And her father had fallen down and hurt his knee.

Just before she went away her sweetheart, whose name was Jack,
Said to her 'I fear you will not be true';
And so she had to promise him before she got on the train,
That every night at eight o'clock she would burst into tears.

She came to the city, and was riding on a street car,
When a man got up and offered her his seat;
She refused the offer with scorn, for she saw that he wore a ring,
And she didn't know but that he might be a married man.

Then up came the conductor and said, 'I knew you would be true!'
And tore off his false whiskers, and it was Jack!
And that day she got a telegram saying that her father's knee was better,
And an aunt had died and left her $58,000.00."

== Recordings ==
- "How Mother Made the Soup" Victor

== Sources ==
- Read 'Em and Weep: The Songs you Forgot to Remember, by Sigmund Spaeth, Arco Publishing: 1926, 1945.
- Who's Who in Comedy: Comedians, Comics and Clowns from Vaudeville to Today's Stand-Ups, by Ronald L. Smith.
- The Fatal Glass of Beer, by Harold Bloom, in The Movie That Changed My Life;, edited by David I. Rosenberg; Viking Penguin, 1991.
