= Lena Guilbert Ford =

American poet

- Born: Lena Guilbert Brown; 1870; Venango County, Pennsylvania
- Died: March 7, 1918 (aged 47–48); Maida Vale, England
- Occupation: Lyricist
- Known for: Keep the Home Fires Burning
- Spouse: Harry Hale Ford (divorced)

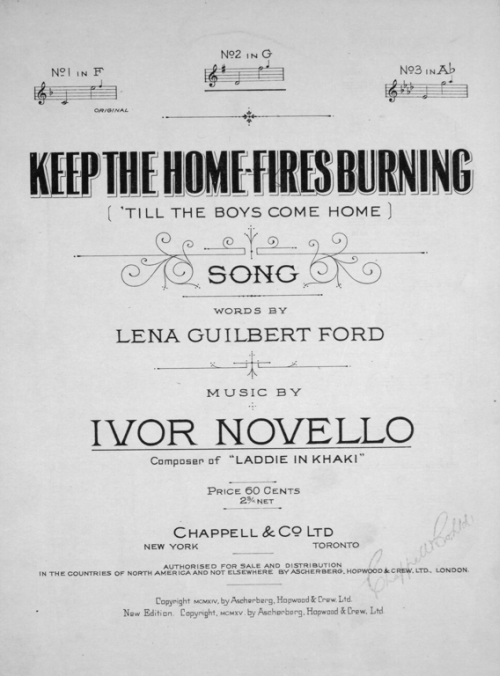
Sheet music cover

Keep the Home Fires Burning
Performed by Frederick Wheeler for Edison Records in late 1915.

Lena Guilbert Brown Ford, middle name sometimes listed as Gilbert, (1870 – March 7, 1918) was a lyricist, best known for "Keep the Home Fires Burning" which she wrote during the First World War.

She was born Lena Guilbert Brown in Venango County, Pennsylvania and attended Elmira College, graduating in 1887. She married physician Harry Hale Ford and settled in Elmira, later divorcing him and relocating, with her mother and son, to London, England, where they would remain for twenty years. During World War I, Ford opened her home to soldiers and took care of them.

While in Britain she met Ivor Novello, with whom she collaborated to produce "Keep the Home Fires Burning" in 1914. It was the first major success for Novello and the only one for Ford. Among Ford's other published musical works are When God Gave You to Me, We Are Coming, Mother England, and God Guard You (with Westell Gordon).

Ford and her thirty-year-old son Walter were the first United States citizens to become fatalities of a German air raid on London, their home in Warrington Crescent, Maida Vale being hit by one of eighteen bombs that fell on the city on the night of 7/8 March 1918. Mrs. Brown, Ford's mother, was only hurt in the bombing. Their remains were returned to and interred in the United States.

== Sources ==
- New York Evening Telegram, March 11, 1918, "American Woman Author and Son Air Raid Victims", p. 8.
- Auburn (New York) Citizen, March 11, 1918, "Author of 'Keep the Home Fires Burning' is Killed", p. 1.
- New York Times, March 13, 1918, "Mrs. Ford's Estate Raises Knotty Point".
- The Music Trade Review, April 13, 1918, "Royalty Question Before Courts", p. 57.
- Alice Zinska Snyder and Milton Valentine Snyder (1921), Paris Days and London Nights, E.P. Dutton & Company, p. 39.
