= Symphony No. 1 (Villa-Lobos) =

First symphony of Heitor Villa-Lobos

- O Imprevisto
- by Heitor Villa-Lobos
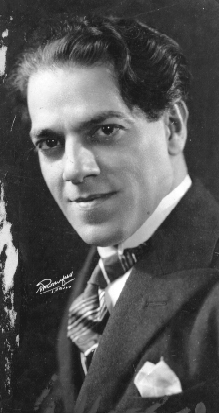
- Heitor Villa-Lobos
- English: The Unforeseen
- Catalogue: W114
- Opus: 112
- Composed: 1916
- Published: 1997: Paris
- Publisher: Max Eschig
- Duration: 25 mins
- Movements: Four

Premiere
- Date: 30 August 1920
- Conductor: Heitor Villa-Lobos
- Performers: Orquestra da Sociedade de Concertos Sinfônicos do Rio de Janeiro

Symphony No. 1, subtitled O Imprevisto (The Unforeseen), is a composition by the Brazilian composer Heitor Villa-Lobos, written in 1916. A typical performance lasts about 25 minutes.

== History ==
Villa-Lobos composed his First Symphony in 1916, to a philosophical argument written by himself under the pseudonym "Epaminondas Villalba Filho". It is the first in a cycle of five symphonies written in the style of Vincent d'Indy.

It was given a partial performance (the second and third movements, according to some sources; the first and fourth movements according to another) on 20 September 1919 in the Theatro Municipal in Rio de Janeiro by the Grande Companhia Italiana, conducted by Gino Marinuzzi. The complete symphony was first performed on 30 August 1920, again in the Theatro Municipal, by the Orquestra da Sociedade de Concertos Sinfônicos do Rio de Janeiro, conducted by the composer. At some later date, Villa-Lobos revised the score, adding tam-tam, glockenspiel, and side drum to the percussion section

Villa-Lobos had written the romantic-symbolic program text for this symphony already in 1907. It concerns the mystic relationship of the artist's soul with fate and the universe, but these philosophically effusive ideas are both difficult to understand and virtually imperceptible in the music. According to the text, the soul of the artist

watches the painful fall of the constellations of other worlds, the reverberation of transitory matter, the transfusion of mortal tears into trembling drops of undulating dew. He sees coils of halos that limply sprawl, baring surprises of falling stars, and he will thus ascend, with his gaze, slowly, to the vast curve of the sunset ...

By uniting, slowly, with the silent harmony of nature, with its joy and its suffering, letting fall tears of Pleasure and Pain, to the rising changes of the enraptured senses ...

So Consciousness, awakening to this sweet and terrible lethargy, shows him the level line, telling him: It is condemned by Fate to suffer the doom of monotony. It is humanity itself! ...

It does not bend nor does it adapt, it does not vibrate and will not move ...

And the soul of the artist, with the blaze of his own light that emanates from him – glimpses, through a subtle and ethereal crystal a vast landscape. Figures, masses, and things that are balanced in a mutual attraction of their own gravity (claimants perhaps to being images, beings, and souls) move in the distressing rhythm of ridiculous puppets, unable to rise up to the cosmic level, where the souls wander ...

== Music ==
The symphony is scored for a large orchestra consisting of 2 piccolos, 2 flutes, 2 oboes, cor anglais, 2 clarinets, bass clarinet, 2 bassoons, contrabassoon, 4 horns, 4 trumpets, 3 trombones, tuba, percussion (timpani, tam-tam, bass drum, cymbals, triangle, side drum, and glockenspiel), celesta, 2 harps, and strings.

It has four movements:

1. Allegro assai moderato
2. Adagio
3. Scherzo (Allegro vivace)
4. Allegro con brio
