= Lee Vincent =

American musician

- Born: Vincent Lee Cerreta; April 15, 1916; Shickshinny, Pennsylvania
- Died: December 11, 2007 (aged 91) Kingston, Pennsylvania
- Genres: Swing music Big band Sweet band
- Occupation: Bandleader
- Instrument: Bass
- Years active: 1943-unspecified

Lee Vincent (April 15, 1916 – December 11, 2007) was an American musician, orchestra leader, talent agent, radio sales manager.

== Biography ==
Born as Vincent Lee Cerreta in Shickshinny, Pennsylvania, Lee Vincent started learning music early. He learned to play the violin at age 9, quickly switching to the bass.

Vincent fought in World War II from 1943 to 1946, and played during that time with famed big band leader Glenn Miller, before Miller died in a plane crash. He put together groups bearing his name – the Lee Vincent Orchestra, the Lee Vincent Band and the Lee Vincent Trio, starting in 1946, and helped book musicians for performers until his death. His career as a sales manager for WILK and WBAX, and other stations spread his notoriety and Big Band music across Northeastern Pennsylvania.

His band played alongside Nat King Cole, Frank Sinatra, Jr., Aretha Franklin, Clay Aiken, and many others. He played Fine Arts Fiestas and Wilkes-Barre events.

Lee Vincent died at the age of 91, at his home in Kingston, Pennsylvania.

In 2023, Vincent was posthumously inducted into the Luzerne County Arts & Entertainment Hall of Fame. He was a member of the Hall of Fame's inaugural class of inductees.

== Family ==
He married twice, first to Angeline Prince in 1937 (who died in 1954) and then to Lucille Cinti in 1955 (Cinti died in 2001). He had five children, six grandchildren, six great-grandchildren and many nieces and nephews at the time of his death.
