= Jessie MacLachlan =

Scottish Gaelic soprano (1866–1916)

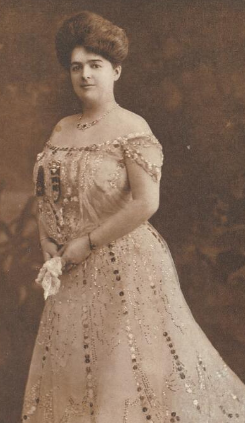
- Jessie MacLachlan, from a postcard published in Australia, circa 1900; from the National Library of Australia
- Born: 18 June 1866; Oban, Scotland
- Died: 13 May 1916 (aged 49); Glasgow, Scotland
- Other names: Seònaid NicLachlainn (Gaelic)
- Occupation: Singer

Jessie Niven MacLachlan (Scottish Gaelic: Seònaid NicLachlainn) (18 June 1866 – 13 May 1916) was a Scottish Gaelic soprano.

== Early life ==
Jessie Niven MacLachlan was born at Oban, the eldest of eight children born to Alexander MacLachlan and Margaret Campbell Niven. Her father was an auctioneer.

== Career ==
MacLachlan achieved fame as a stage singer of Gaelic song. She performed for Queen Victoria, at Balmoral Castle in 1892. She toured extensively. She shared a bill with singer Harry Lauder and violinist Mackenzie Murdoch on a Scottish tour. She toured in North America in 1901; while in Canada, she sang with a teenaged Henry Burr, at the Opera House in Saint John. In 1902, she sang at the Scottish Concert of the London Inverness-shire Association, to raise funds for Scottish scholarships and a "Home Club for Highland Lads" in London. In 1905 she sang at a Burns Monument Fund benefit concert in Boston. She performed in New Zealand in 1905 and again in 1907.

During her North American tour, MacLachlan was celebrated in newspapers and helped to increase the popularity of Gaelic song there. "Whether it is crooning a Highland cradle song, or a call to the clans to take up arms, she is equally successful", observed one New Zealand reviewer in 1907, about her repertoire.

In September 1899, MacLachlan made the first commercial gramophone recordings of Gaelic song, performing "Oro Mo Nighean Donn Bhòidheach" ('Ho-ro my Beautiful Brown Maiden') and "Mo Dhachaigh" ('My Home') to piano accompaniment. She made further recordings in England in 1903.

In October 2024, it was announced there would be a tribute to MacLachlan at the Royal National Mòd in November 2024.

== Personal life ==
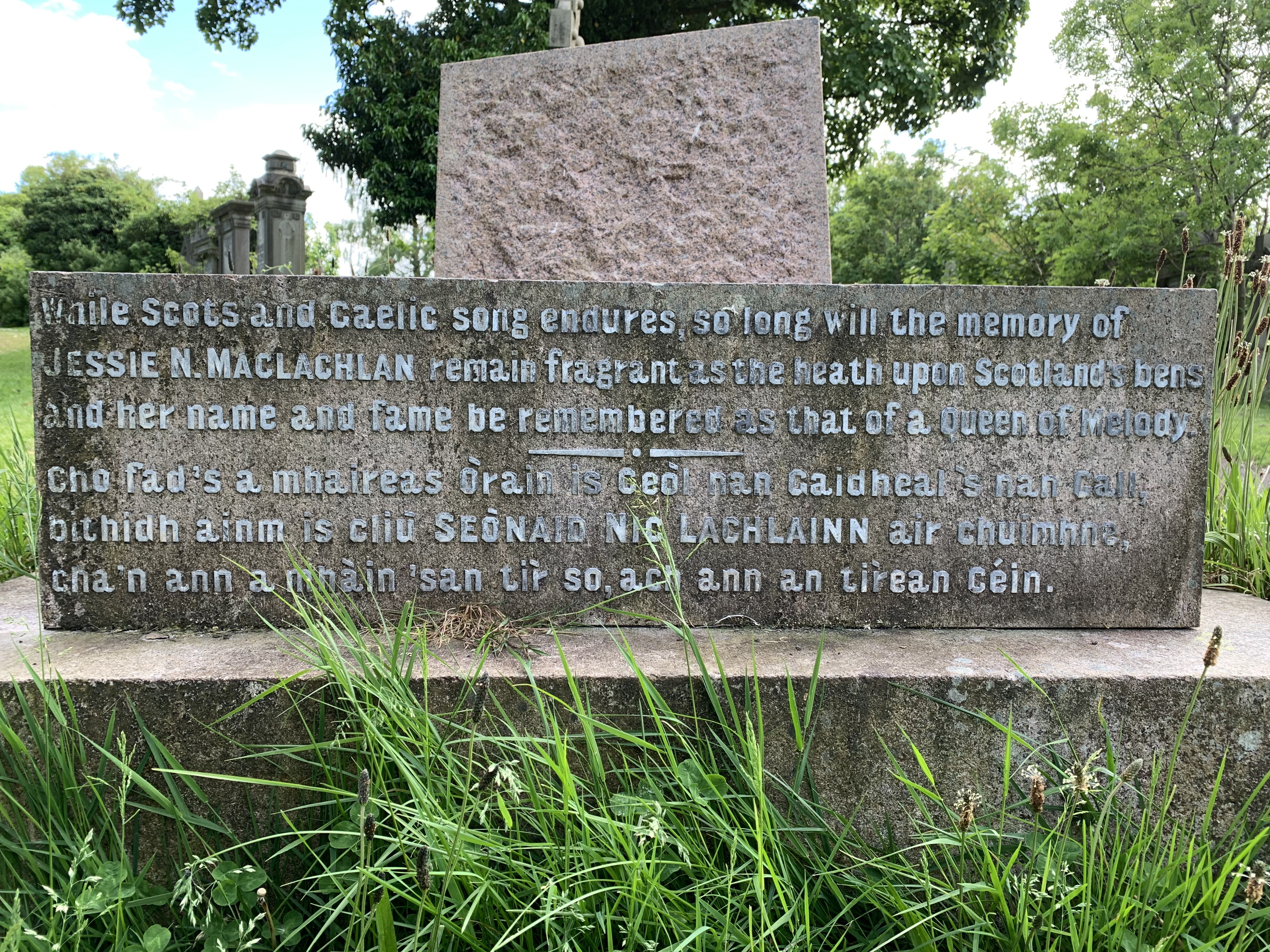
Jessie MacLachlan's headstone in Cathcart Cemetery, Glasgow

Jessie MacLachlan married her accompanist, Robert Buchanan, in 1887. They had a son. She died in Glasgow in 1916 at the age of 49, shortly after making a "hazardous journey" from France during World War I. Her grave is located in Cathcart Cemetery.
