= Keep the Home Fires Burning (Ivor Novello song) =

"Keep the Home-Fires Burning"
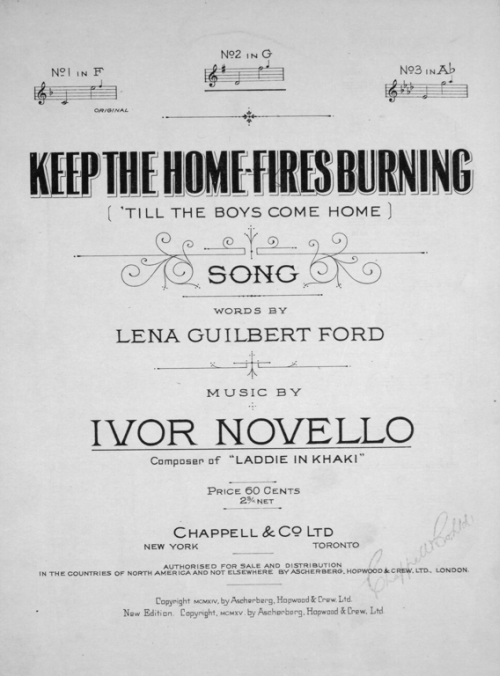
- Sheet music cover (1915 edition)

Song
- Written: 1914
- Composer: Ivor Novello
- Lyricist: Lena Guilbert Ford

"Keep the Home-Fires Burning (Till the Boys Come Home)" is a British patriotic First World War song composed in 1914 by Ivor Novello with words by Lena Guilbert Ford (whose middle name was sometimes printed as "Gilbert").

The song was published first as "'Till the Boys Come Home" on 8 October 1914 by Ascherberg, Hopwood and Crew Ltd. in London. A new edition was printed in 1915 with the name "Keep the Home-Fires Burning". The song became very popular in the United Kingdom during the war, along with "It's a Long Way to Tipperary".

James F. Harrison recorded "Keep the Home-Fires Burning" in 1915, as did Stanley Kirkby in 1916. Another popular recording was sung by tenor John McCormack in 1917, who was also the first to record "It's a Long Way to Tipperary" in 1914. (See External links below to hear these recordings of "Keep the Home-Fires Burning".) Other versions include one by Frederick J. Wheeler and one by the duet Reed Miller & Frederick Wheeler.

The lyricist Lena Ford was killed in March 1918 during a German air raid on her home in Warrington Crescent in Maida Vale. There is a misconception that Ivor Novello's mother wrote the lyrics for the song (propagated—for example—by patter in recorded performances of British musical comedy duo Hinge and Bracket) but Lena Ford (an American) was a friend and collaborator of Novello, not a blood relation.

The opening of the melody bears a resemblance to Gustav Holst's setting of the Christmas carol "In the Bleak Midwinter".

Keep the Home Fires Burning
Performed by Frederick Wheeler for Edison Records in late 1915

== Lyrics ==
They were summoned from the hillside,
They were called in from the glen,
And the country found them ready
At the stirring call for men
Let no tears add to their hardships
As the soldiers pass along,
And although your heart is breaking,
Make it sing this cheery song:

Refrain
Keep the Home Fires Burning,
While your hearts are yearning.
Though your lads are far away
They dream of home.
There's a silver lining
Through the dark cloud shining,
Turn the dark cloud inside out
Till the boys come home.

Overseas there came a pleading,
"Help a nation in distress."
And we gave our glorious laddies—
Honour made us do no less, [or Honour bade us do no less]
For no gallant son of Freedom [or For no gallant Son of Britain]
To a tyrant's yoke should bend, [or To a foreign yoke shall bend]
And a noble heart must answer [or And no Englishman is silent]
To the sacred call of "Friend".

Refrain

== In popular culture ==
- The song is sung by Joan Fontaine and a group of British soldiers in the 1942 film This Above All.
- The song was included in the 1969 musical Oh! What a Lovely War and in the 1970 musical film Darling Lili.
- The song is heard playing in the background of the train station scene in Episode 4 of the fourth season of the British drama Upstairs Downstairs. The episode is called "Women Shall Not Weep". The scene sees the character of Edward (footman) saying farewell to his new wife Daisy (housemaid) at the railway station, as he departs for the trenches in France in 1915.
- The song is featured in the 1981 film Chariots of Fire.
- In the 2002 film Gosford Park, the guests at a country house are entertained by Novello (played by Jeremy Northam), who performs the song on the piano.
- In the film Johnny Got His Gun when the characters are celebrating a Christmas party; this clip was later used at the end of Metallica's music video, "One".
- Featured in the Seán O'Casey play The Plough and the Stars.
- The last refrain is sung by the employees of Are You Being Served? in the episode "Camping In."
- The main chorus is sung by the entire cast of M*A*S*H in the episode "War of Nerves" (Season 6, episode 5) during a stress-relieving "bon-type-fire".
- The song is briefly heard in a scene of new army recruits marching in a parade in the 1930 film A Soldier's Plaything.
- The song is performed at the conclusion of The Still Alarm (1925), a one-act play by George S. Kaufman.
- The song is performed in the 1976 film Aces High.
- The song is sung by a chorus of British army soldiers awaiting rescue at Dunkirk in the 2007 movie Atonement.

== Bibliography ==
- Ford, Lena Guilbert (w.); Novello, Ivor (m.). "Keep the Home-Fires Burning ('Till the Boys Come Home)"(Sheet music). New York: Chappell & Co. Ltd. (1915).
