= Charlottenkreuz =

Charlotte Cross (Charlottenkreuz)
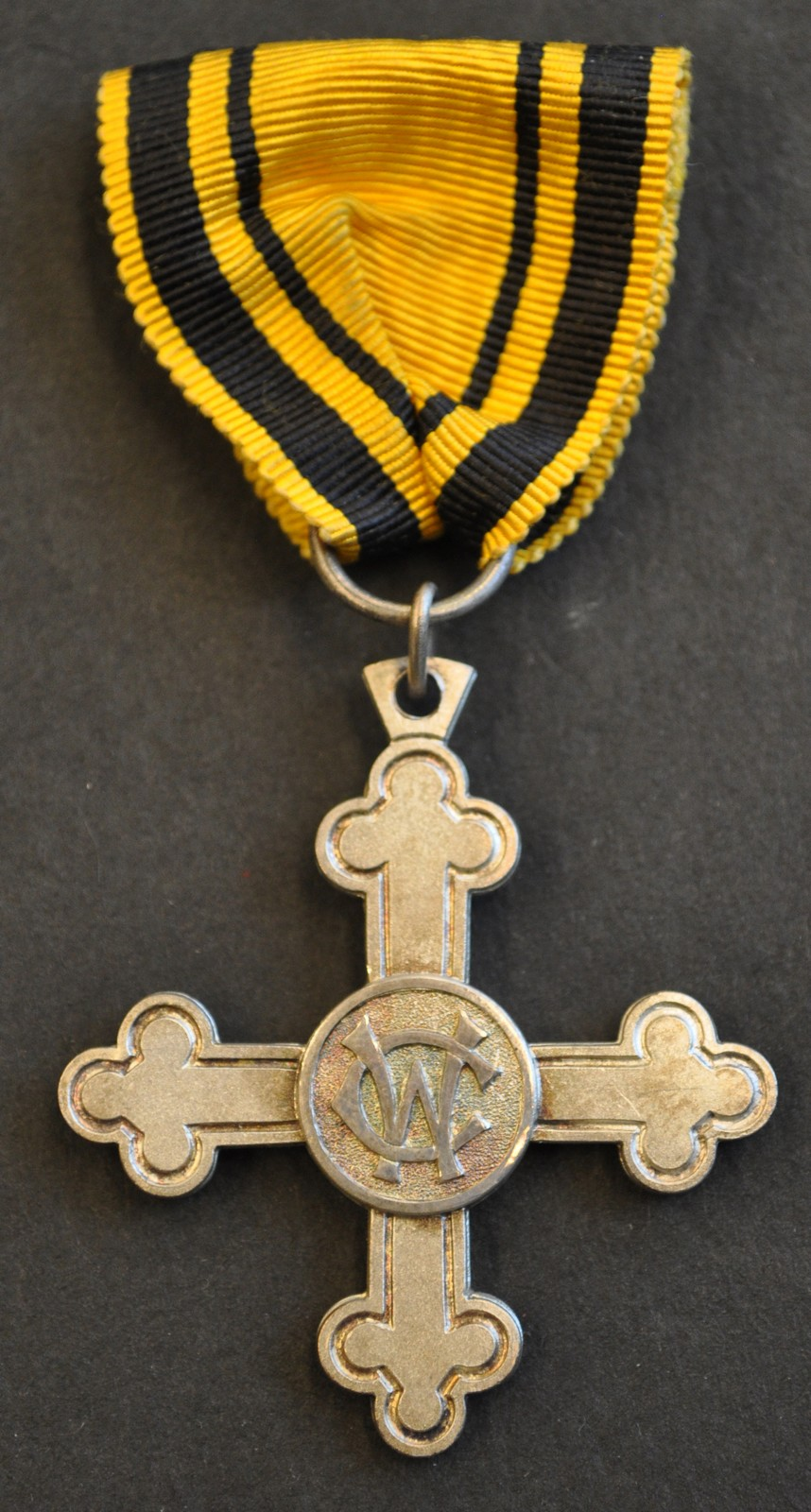
- Obverse of the Charlottenkreuz
- Description: Silvered white metal cross botonny with a central medallion, bearing on the front the entwined initials C and W (for Charlotte and Wilhelm) and on the reverse the year 1916.
- Presented by: The Kingdom of Württemberg
- Eligibility: Persons who had acquired particular merit either in the field or at home in the care of the wounded and ill, or in the general area of war-related care provision.
- Status: Obsolete
- Established: 5 January 1916
- Ribbon of the order

The Charlottenkreuz ("Charlotte Cross") was a decoration instituted on 5 January 1916 by King William II of Württemberg and named after his wife, the Queen of Württemberg, born Princess Charlotte of Schaumburg-Lippe. It was to be awarded to all persons who had acquired particular merit either in the field or at home in the care of the wounded and ill, or in the general area of war-related care provision.

The decoration is a silvered white metal cross botonny with a central medallion, bearing on the front the entwined initials C and W (for Charlotte and Wilhelm) and on the reverse the year 1916.

The decoration was worn on a yellow ribbon, with a narrow and a wide black stripe on each side, on the left breast.

== Sources and external links ==
- Hauptarchiv des Landes Baden-Württemberg: information on the establishment and award of the decoration (in German)
- Coin Archives.com: photograph of the Charlottenkreuz
