= I Got Mine =

I Got Mine may refer to:

- I Got Mine (Motörhead song), a song by English hard rock band Motörhead
- I Got Mine (The Black Keys song), a song by blues-rock band The Black Keys
- I Got Mine, a song by John Queen and Charlie Cartwell, first recorded and released by Arthur Collins (singer) and Joe Natus in 1902, with later versions (with rewritten lyrics) recorded by Frank Stokes in 1928, Pink Anderson, Ry Cooder, and others

== See also ==
- "I've Got Mine", the second single by English rock band Small Faces
