= Collins & Harlan =

American musical duo

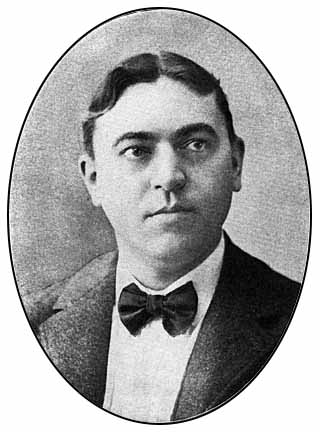
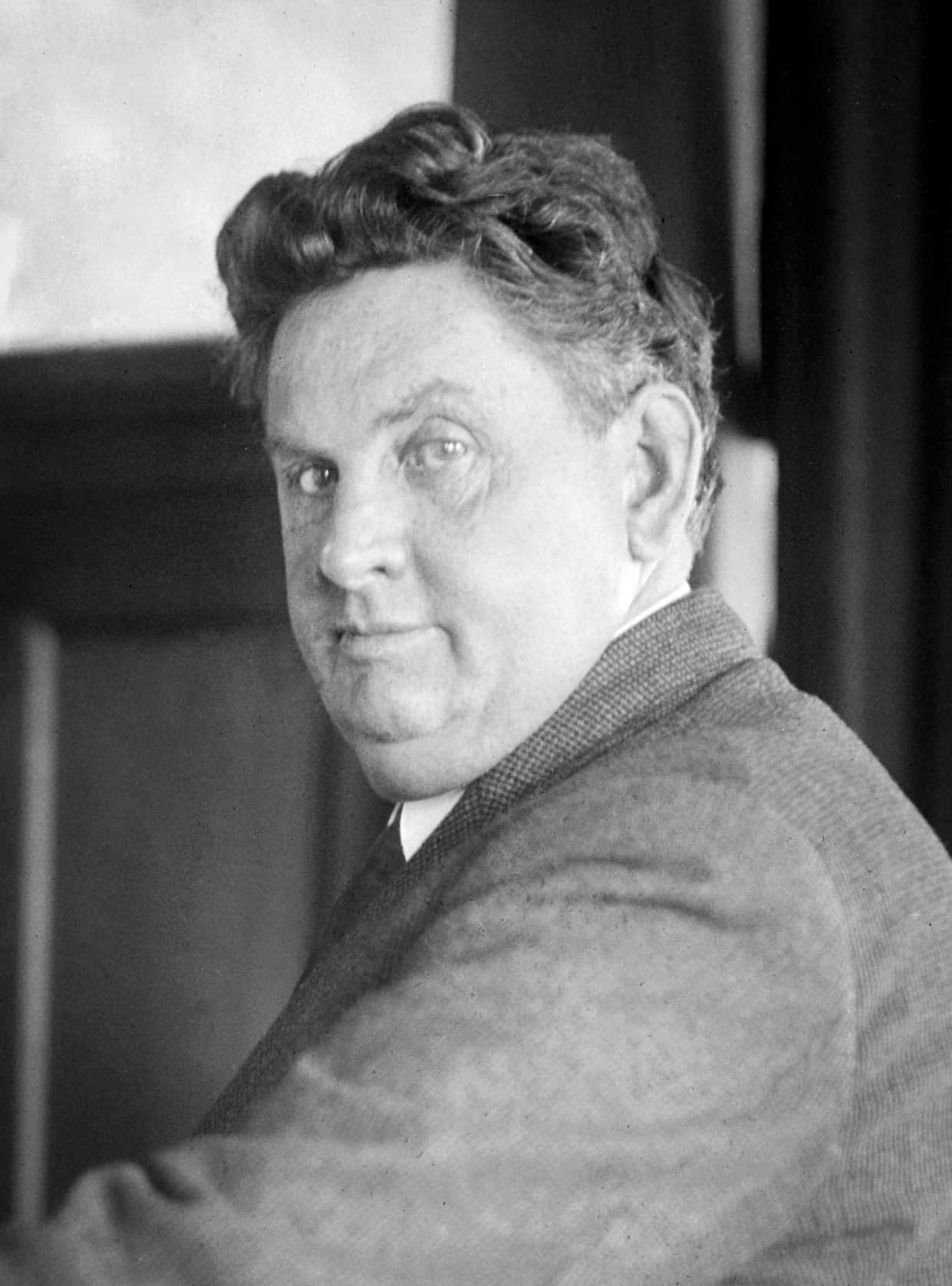
Arthur Collins (left) and Byron G. Harlan (right)

Collins & Harlan, the team of American singers Arthur Collins and Byron G. Harlan, formed a popular comic duo between 1903 and 1926. They sang ragtime standards as well as what were known as "coon songs" – music sung by white performers in a black dialect. Their material also employed many other stereotypes of the time including Irishmen and farmers. Rival recording artist Billy Murray nicknamed them "The Half-Ton Duo" as both men were rather overweight. Collins and Harlan produced many number one hits with recordings of minstrel songs such as "My Gal Irene", "I Know Dat I'll be Happy Til I Die", "Who Do You Love?" and "Down Among the Sugarcane". Their song "That Funny Jas Band from Dixieland", recorded November 8, 1916, is among the first recorded uses of the word "jas" which eventually evolved to "jass", and to the current spelling "jazz".

== Songs by year ==
"Alexander's Ragtime Band" (1911)
1911 recording by singing duo Arthur Collins and Byron G. Harlan which became a smash hit due to its intentionally comedic elements.

"That Funny Jas Band from Dixieland" (1916)
1916 recording by Collins & Harlan on an Edison Blue Amberol cylinder which is purportedly the oldest known recording of a jazz song.

"The Chanticleer Rag" (1910)
September 1910 recording of Albert Gumble's "The Chanticleer Rag", sung by Collins & Harlan and published by Albany Indestructible.

1902

"First Rehearsal for the Husking Bee", "Jerry Murphy is a Friend of Mine", "Two Rubes in a Tavern", "The Troubles of the Reuben and the Maid", "Under the Bamboo Tree", "Down Where the Wurtzburger Flows"

1903

"It Was The Dutch", "Parody on Hiawatha", "Moriarity", "Hurrah For Baffin's Bay", "They Were All Doing the Same", "Oh, Didn't He Ramble?", "He was a Sailor", "Strike Out McCracken", "Closing Time at the Country Grocery", "Trouble",

1904

"What Would the Neighbors Say?", "Barney", "Under the Anheuser Bush", "Goodbye, Fedora", "Possum Pie", "Down on the Brandywine", "Gone, Gone, Gone", "Village Maid", "Heinie", "Does You Love Me As You Used To, Miss Jane?"

1905

"Tammany", "Leader of the German Band", "Mule Song", "Down Where the Sweet Potatoes Grow", "Coax Me", "Oh, Oh, Sallie", "Jaspar, Don't You Hear Me Calling You?", "Murphy", "Farewell Mister Abner Hemingway", "Peter Piper", "Take a Car", "Come on, Little Girl, Come Along", "Hey! Mister Joshua"

1906

"Camp Meeting Time", "Nigger Loves His Possum", "I'm A-Dreaming of You", "Out in an Automobile", "My Lovin' Henry", "Central, Give Me Back My Dime", "Gretchen", "Traveling", "When Mose With His Nose Leads the Band", "It's Up to You to Move", "Honey, Won't You Love Me Like You Used to?", "Come Take a Skate With Me", "Susan, Kiss Me Good and Hard", "Won't You Leave Your Happy Home For Me?", "Afloat On a Five Dollar Note", "Anxious"

1907

"Arrah Wanna", "Good-a-Bye John", "I'm Thinkin' Bout You Honey All the Time", "Won't You Throw a Kiss To Me", "I'm Keeping My Love-Lamp Burning For You", "Lovin' Time", "And a Little Bit More", "Every Little Bit, Added to What You've Got", "Just Help Yourself", "I'm Runnin' After Nancy", "Who Do You Love?", "Bake Dat Chicken Pie", "I Know Dat I'll be Happy Til I Die"

1908

"Down in Jungle Town", "My Gal Irene", "Come on and Kiss Your Baby", "Nothing Hardly Ever Troubles Me", "Cohan's Rage Babe", "A High Old Time in Dixie", "Alexander and His Clarinet", "My Brudda Sylvest'"

1909

"Down Among The Sugar Cane", "My Wife's Gone to the Country", "The Right Church, But the Wrong Pew", "Alabam'"

1910

"Ain't You Coming Out Tonight?", "Casey Jones", "Swingin in De Sky", "The Chanticleer Rag"

1911

"I'm Going Back to Dixie", "Under the Yum Yum Tree", "Put Your Arms Around Me, Honey", "Alexander's Ragtime Band", "Baby Rose", "On Mobile Bay"

1912

"Hitchy-Koo", "The Ragtime Soldier Man"

1913

"When the Midnight Choo-Choo Leaves for Alabam'", "The International Rag", "Melinda's Wedding Day", "At the Levee on Revival Day"

1914

"Aba Daba Honeymoon", "I Love the Ladies", "It's a Very Easy Thing to Put a Ring Upon a Finger, But Try to Take it Off"

1915

"Alabama Jubilee", "Auntie Skinner's Chicken Dinner", "Those Charlie Chaplin Feet"

1916

"That Funny Jas Band from Dixieland", "Oh, How She Could Yacki Hacki Wicki Wachi Woo (That's Love in Honolulu)", "All Aboard for Chinatown", "At the Old Plantation Ball", "Come Along to Caroline"

1917

"Three Pickaninnies", "The Old Grey Mare"

1918

"Darktown Strutters' Ball"

1919

"Sipping Cider Through a Straw"

== See also ==
- Tin Pan Alley
- Minstrel Show
