= Don't Give a Damn =

Don't Give a Damn may refer to:

- Frankly, my dear, I don't give a damn, film quotation from Gone with the Wind'
- Don't Give a Damn (film), 1995 Hong Kong movie
- I Don't Give a Damn, 1987 Israeli drama film
- "We Don't Give a Damn for the Whole State of Michigan", novelty song
- "I Just Don't Give a Damn" song by George Jones
