= Byron G. Harlan =

American singer

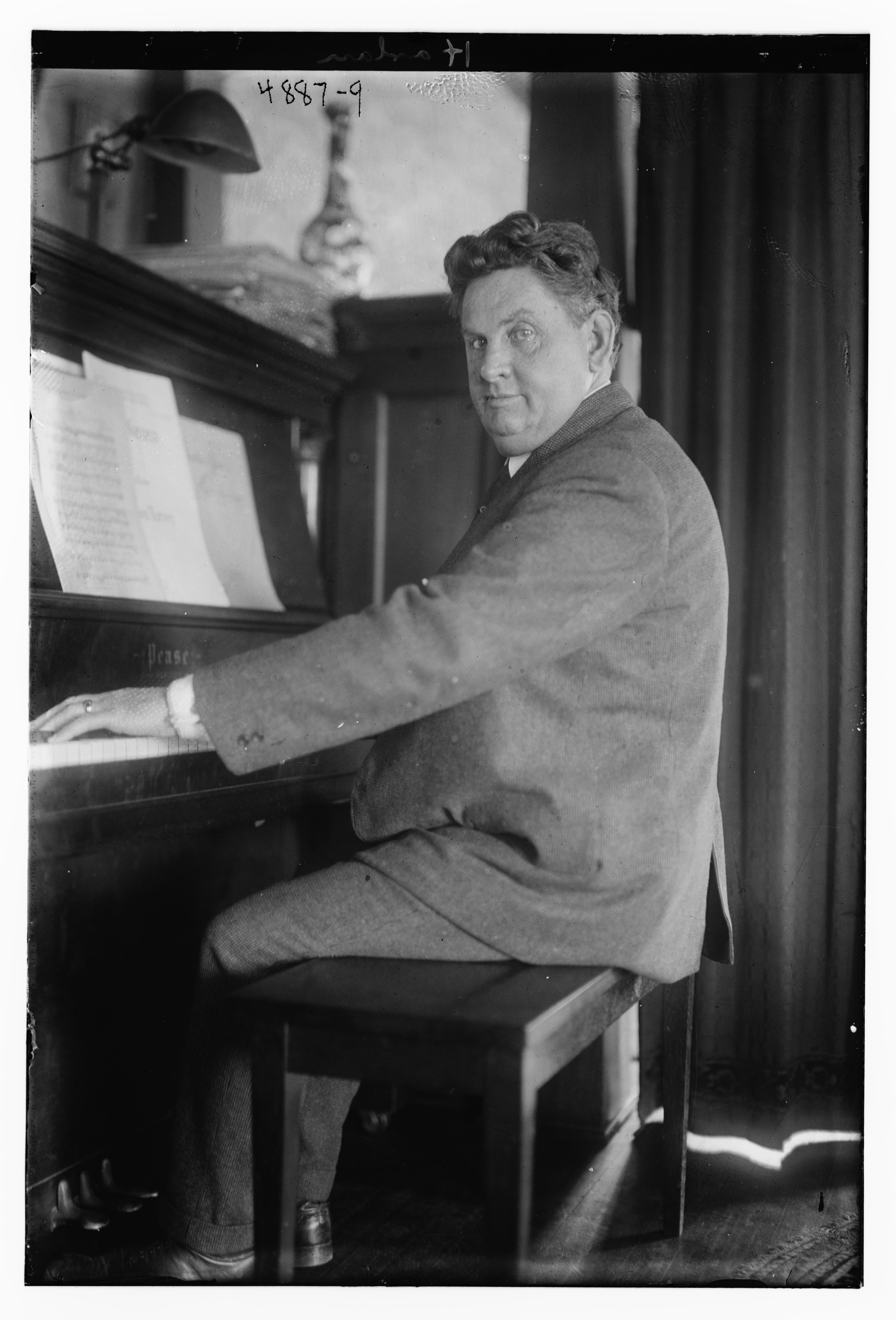
Byron George Harlan between 1915 and 1920

Byron George Harlan (August 29, 1861 – September 11, 1936) was an American singer from Kansas, a comic minstrel singer and balladeer who often recorded with Arthur Collins. The two together were often billed as "Collins & Harlan".

== Solo recordings ==
1899

- "Please, Mr. Conductor, Don't Put Me Off The Train" (remade 1903 on Edison Gold Moulded 7219) (w.m. J. Fred Helf)

1901

- "Hello Central, Give Me Heaven"

1903

- "Please Mother, Buy Me A Baby" (w.m. Will D. Cobb & Gus Edwards)

- on Victor & Edison

- "Always In The Way" (w.m. Charles K. Harris)

- on Edison Records

- "The Vacant Chair" (w. Henry S. Washburn m. George Frederick Root)

- on Edison

1904

- '"Sweetest Girl in Dixie"

- on Leeds Talk-o-Phone

1905

- "My Gal Sal"
- "A Picnic For Two"
- "Bright Eyes Goodbye"
- "With the Robins I'll Return"

-on Edison Records

- "Where Morning Glories Twine Around the Door" Oxford Disc Record #3282

1906

- "Wait 'Till the Sun Shines, Nellie"
- "Cheer Up Mary" - Edison Gold Moulded 9403
- "When The Sunset Turns The Ocean's Blue To Gold - Columbia & United Talking Machine A439

1907

- "And A Little Child Shall Lead Them" - Edison Gold Moulded 9472
- "I'm Tying The Leaves So They Won't Come Down" - Edison Gold Moulded 9606
- "School Days (When We Were A Couple of Kids)" - Victor 5086

1908

- "Are You Sincere?" - Edison Gold Moulded 9973
- “Always me.” - Edison Standard Record 10009

1912

- "They Gotta Quit Kickin' My Dawg Aroun'" - Edison Standard Record 10559

1917

- "With His Hands In His Pockets (And His Pockets In His Pants)" - Edison Blue Amberol 3124

1919

- "Way Down East Where I Belong" - OKEH Record 1134-B

1921

- "Down Where I Belong" - Pathe 20660

== With Arthur Collins ==
1902

- "They Were All Doing The Same" - Edison Gold Moulded 8255

1903 Meet Me Down At Luna Lena - Zon-O-Phone 194

1904

- "Under The Anheuser Bush - Columbia 32409
- "Down On The Brandywine" - Edison Gold Moulded 8712

1905

- "In My Merry Oldsmobile" - Columbia 85016 (6" length cylinder - most were 5" length)
- "Peter Piper" - 20th Century Talking Machine Record 85001
- "Negro Recollections" (with Vess L. Ossman on banjo) - Edison Gold Moulded 7665
- "Every Ship Will Find A Harbor" -Edison Gold Moulded 9732

1906

- "Afloat On A Five Dollar Note" - Edison Gold Moulded 9316
- "Traveling" - Edison Gold Moulded 9287
- "Camp Meeting Time" - Edison Gold Moulded 9415
- "Take A Car" - Victor 4372

1907

- "Come On And Kiss Yo' Baby" - Victor 16224-A
- "Bake Dat Chicken Pie" - Victor 17221-B
- "Arrah Wanna" - Edison Gold Moulded 9447
- "Ev'ry Little Bit Added To What You've Got Makes Just A Little Bit More" - Edison Gold Moulded 9611

1908

- "Cohan's Rag Babe - Columbia 33282

1909

- "Down At The Huskin' Bee"
- "Down Where the Big Bananas Grow" - Edison Amberol 308
- "Make A Noise Like A Hoop And Roll Away" - Edison Standard 10122
- "My Wife's Gone To The Country" - Columbia A724

1910

- "That Beautiful Rag" - Columbia Indestructible 1424

1911

- "The Barn Dance"
- "Alexander's Ragtime Band"

1912

- "I'm Goin' Back to Dixie"
- "The Ragtime Soldier Man" - Victor and Columbia Records

1914

- "The Aba Daba Honeymoon" - Edison Blue Amberol 2468

1915

- "Alabama Jubilee"
- "Kentucky Home"

1916

- "The Kid Is Clever"

1918

- "The Old Grey Mare"

1919

- "On the Ozark Trail"

1922

- "Ham & Eggs"

== With Aileen Stanley ==
1913

- "Tramp! Tramp! Tramp!" - Edison Amberol "Special H" and Edison Blue Amberol "Special H"

== With Arthur Stanley ==
1909

- "Marching Through Georgia" - Victor 16416-A

== With Frank C. Stanley ==
1902

- "All Aboard for Slumberville" - Edison Gold Moulded 8187

1904

- "Blue Bell" - Edison Gold Moulded 8655

1904

- "Dixie", or "I wish I was in Dixie" - Edison Gold Moulded 8784

1905

- "You're My Heart's Desire, I Love You, Nellie Dean" - Edison Gold Moulded 9013
- "Soldier Boy" -Columbia 3067

== With Joseph Belmont ==
1903

- "While the Birds are Singing to Me" - Edison Gold Moulded 9583

1904

- "Robin and the Wren" - Edison Gold Moulded 8662

1905

- "Beautiful Birds Sing On" - Edison Gold Moulded 9022

== With Steve Porter ==
1913

- "Two Jolly Sailors" - Edison Blue Amberol 1759
