= Emma Carus =

American actress (1879–1927)

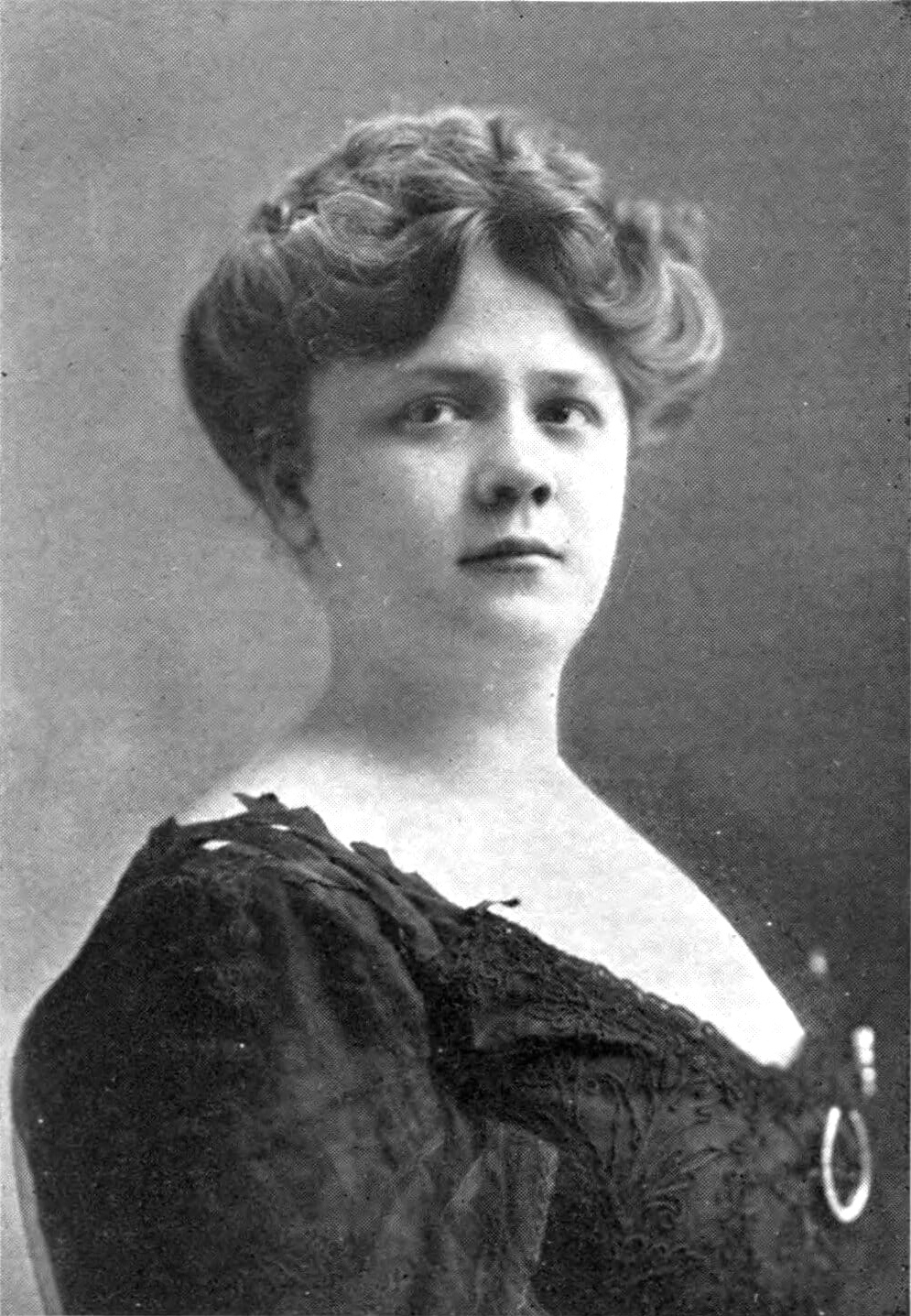
Who's Who On The Stage; 1906

Emma Carus (March 18, 1879 – November 18, 1927) was an American contralto singer from New York City who was in the cast of the original Ziegfeld Follies in 1907.

She frequently sang in vaudeville and sometimes in Broadway features. One columnist described her as "a sort of combination of Sophie Tucker and Fay Templeton with a little of Eva Tanguay and Eddie Foy thrown in for good measure."

== Vocalist in theater ==
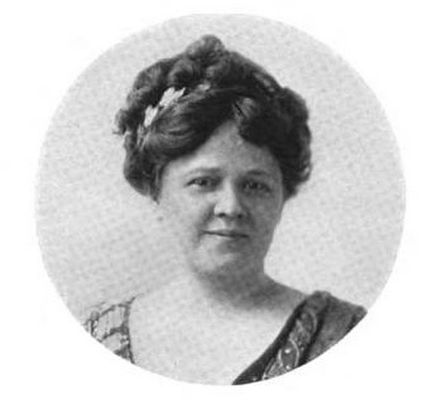
Emma Carus, from a 1916 publication.

She appeared in the drama Rally Round the Flag at the Union Square Theatre in August 1897. The venue at 50 East 14th Street was owned by Benjamin Franklin Keith and Edward Franklin Albee II, who purchased the theater in 1893 to host vaudeville performances. Carus was described as a ballad singer prior to her performance at the Olympia Roof Garden, Broadway (Manhattan) between 44th Street and 45th Street, in September 1897. The following month she shared a program at the Pleasure Palace with the Dunbar Sisters and Henry E. Dixey. The entertainment hall was managed by Frederick Freeman Proctor and was located on East Fifty-Eighth Street between Third Avenue (Manhattan-Bronx) and Lexington Avenue (Manhattan).

A varied lineup of acts was presented by Sam T. Jack's Theatre, Madison Street (Chicago), State Street (Chicago), Chicago, in June 1898. Carus joined Troja, Jennie Yeamans, and the Washburn sisters on a bill.

In October 1905 Carus appeared on Broadway at Proctor's Fifth Avenue (Manhattan) Theatre. This was her first Broadway engagement since a show at the Wistaria Grove, which was located on the roof of the New York Theatre.

The Follies of 1907 took place at the Jardin de Paris on the roofs of the New York Theatre and the Criterion Theatre. Produced by Florenz Ziegfeld, a large audience observed the thirteen parts, which were vaudeville acts. Carus headed a cast that was supported by a chorus quite similar to an earlier one that assisted Anna Held in The Paris Model.

She was in a production of The Wife Hunters, a musical play in three acts, in which she sang in a pleasant, deep-throated way, and with a suggestion of a sense of humor of sentiment as occasion may require. Her comedy number was "Girls, Keep Your Figures". The Herald Square Theatre, 1331 Broadway (29 West 35th Street), produced the play which was based on a book by Edgar Allan Woolf.

In 1911, Carus is said to have been largely responsible for helping introduce and popularize Irving Berlin's first major hit song, "Alexander's Ragtime Band". In Chicago, it especially became identified with her, and soon it worked its way back to New York where Al Jolson picked it up and it quickly caught on in popularity.

Carus sang at the Palace Theatre in a production which starred Bertha Kalich in March 1914. Also entertaining were the Beauties of Jesse Lasky and George White, noted for George White's Scandals. Carus returned for a fourth year on the interstate vaudeville circuit in 1914. This time she was accompanied by a dance partner, Carl Randall. She had a new stock of songs that included An Irish Suffragette.

== Personal life ==
Carus fainted at the Great Northern Hotel in Chicago, Illinois, after hearing of her lover's suicide in June 1897. James Burrows killed himself in Nashville, Tennessee, where he managed a theater. Carus tried to commit suicide with a revolver after learning of Burrows' demise, but was prevented by her friends. She believed that his mother tried to influence Burrows against her.

In April 1913 Carus secured a judgment against W. Lewis Stevens, a broker. Stevens and his partner, James W. Henning, were accused by her of embezzling more than $2,200 of her money for their own use when their company failed in 1910. Stevens was arrested at the Iroquois Hotel, 49 West 44th Street, New York City.

She was an avid baseball fan who followed the New York Giants of John McGraw. Carus attended every World Series from 1905 until 1913. In a syndicated column she predicted wrongly the Giants to be victorious over the Philadelphia Athletics in the 1913 World Series.
