= Coon, Coon, Coon =

1900 song

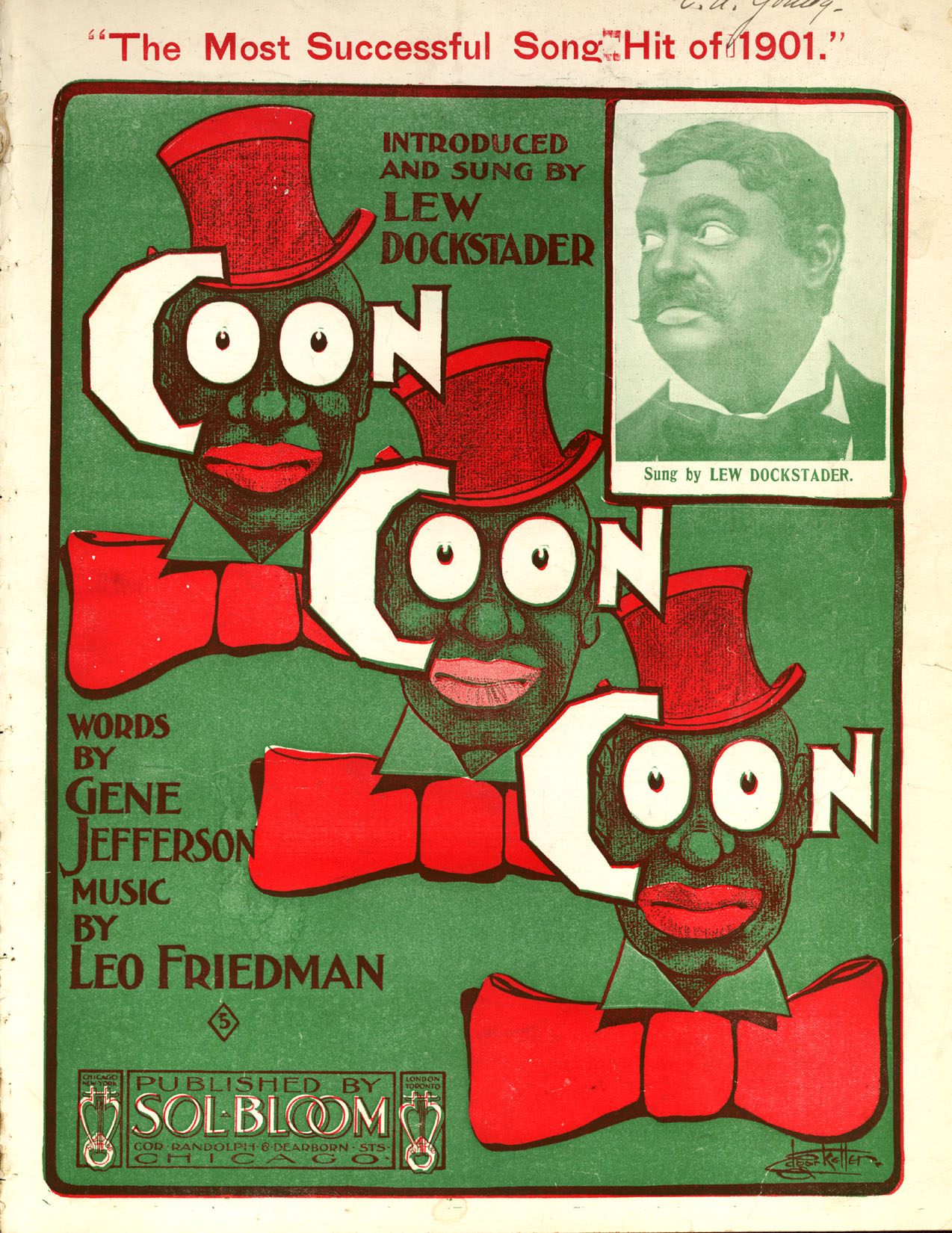
Songsheet cover from 1901 with photograph of Lew Dockstader in blackface inset

"Coon, Coon, Coon" is a "coon song" from 1900. The words were written by Gene Jefferson and the music by Leo Friedman. The lyrics are about an African American concerned with his appearance including his skin color and hair type while not being accepted by a woman. He makes efforts to acquire Caucasian characteristics but fails and is called out. Songsheet cover for the music include caricatured African American faces and a photograph of minstrel performers of the song inset.

The song was performed by Lew Dockstader. Arthur Collins and Joe Natus recorded a rendition of the song on Edison Records in 1901. The University of California Santa Barbara has a brown wax phonograph cylinder recording of the song. A version of the songsheet has a photograph of Irving Jones inset. In 1902, "Coon! Coon! Coon!" was published in the Song-book of the Commandery of the State of Pennsylvania, A. Groux, printer.

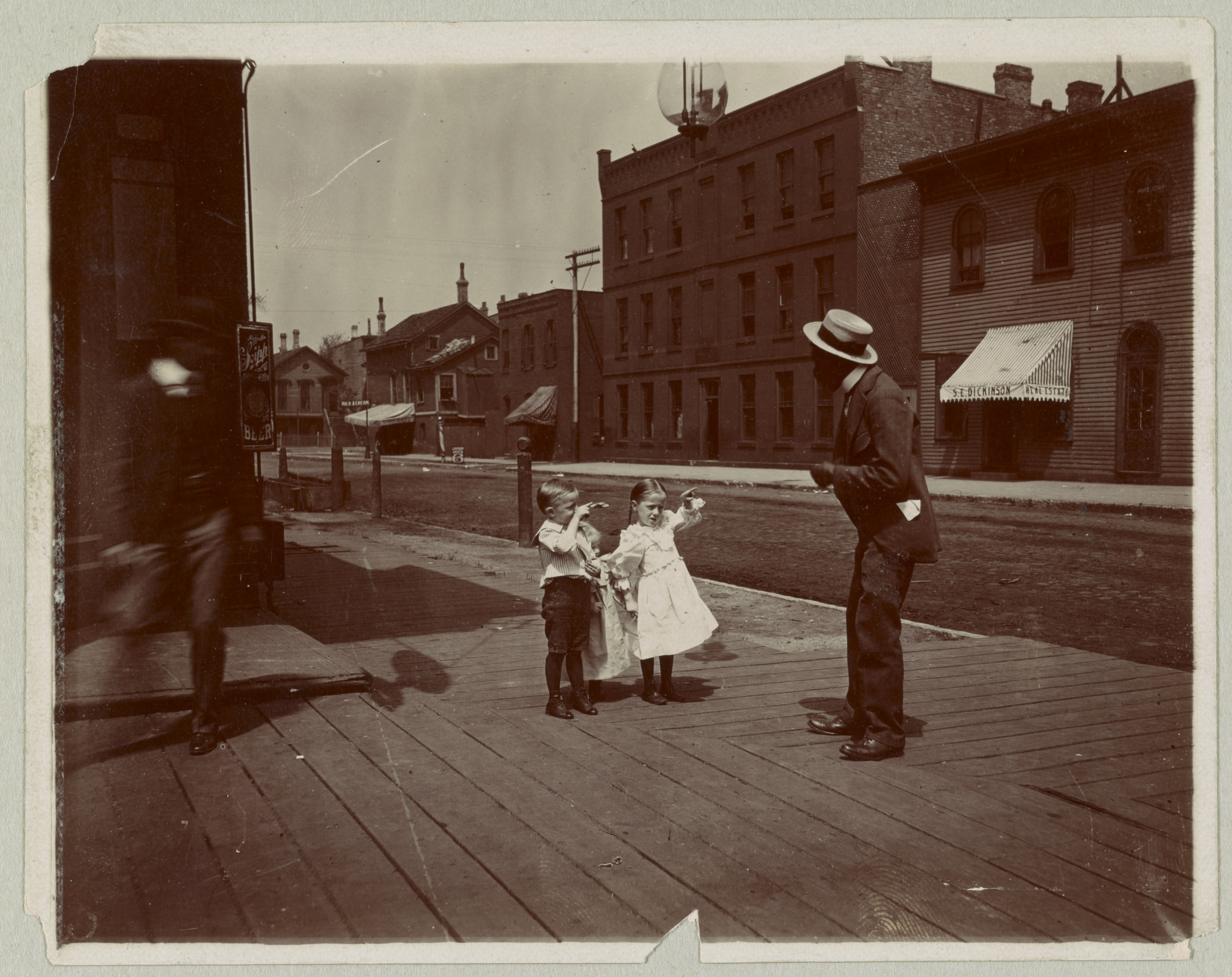
Photograph of two white children pointing at a Black man used to illustrate the song lyrics

The Library of Congress has a set of seven photographs for projection by magic lantern during performances of the song to illustrate its lyrics with a series of vignettes centred on an African American man. The image for the title line shows two Caucasian children pointing at the man.

A version of the song was recorded in the Max Hunter Folk Song Collection.

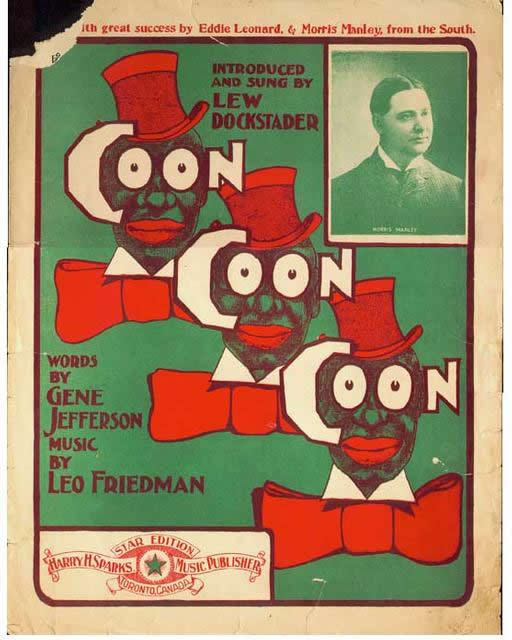
Songsheet with photograph of Morris Manley inset

Coon songs such as this one ridicule African Americans. The derisive term coon, a shortened form of raccoon alluding to cunning, was used to refer to Native Americans, Whigs, and "sly rustic" types before being used to describe African Americans.

Gid Tanner and Fate Norris recorded the song in 1928 as did Will Gilmer and R.O. Mosley. The Taylor Trio recorded it in 1930.

In 1945, William Howland Kenney gave a partial defense of Arthur Collins singing the lyrics of the song and described it as bathetic.

Charles Kenyon incorporated a Caucasian woman struggling to perform the song in the 1929 movie Show Boat.
