= Moses Andrew Jackson Good Bye =

1906 song

"Moses Andrew Jackson Good Bye" is a song published in 1906. The music is composed by Ted Snyder, and the lyrics are written by Ren Shields. The song is about a domestic worker who is fed up with the mistreatment he receives from his master, and therefore decides to leave the household. The song was performed by artists like May Irwin and Arthur Collins.

== Recordings ==
Edison Gold Moulded Record: 9442

Recording location- Philadelphia, Pennsylvania

Recording date- 1906-11-14

Recording repository- Source of original recording: Recorded Sound Section, Library of Congress

== See also ==
- List of pre-1920 jazz standards
