= The Preacher and the Bear =

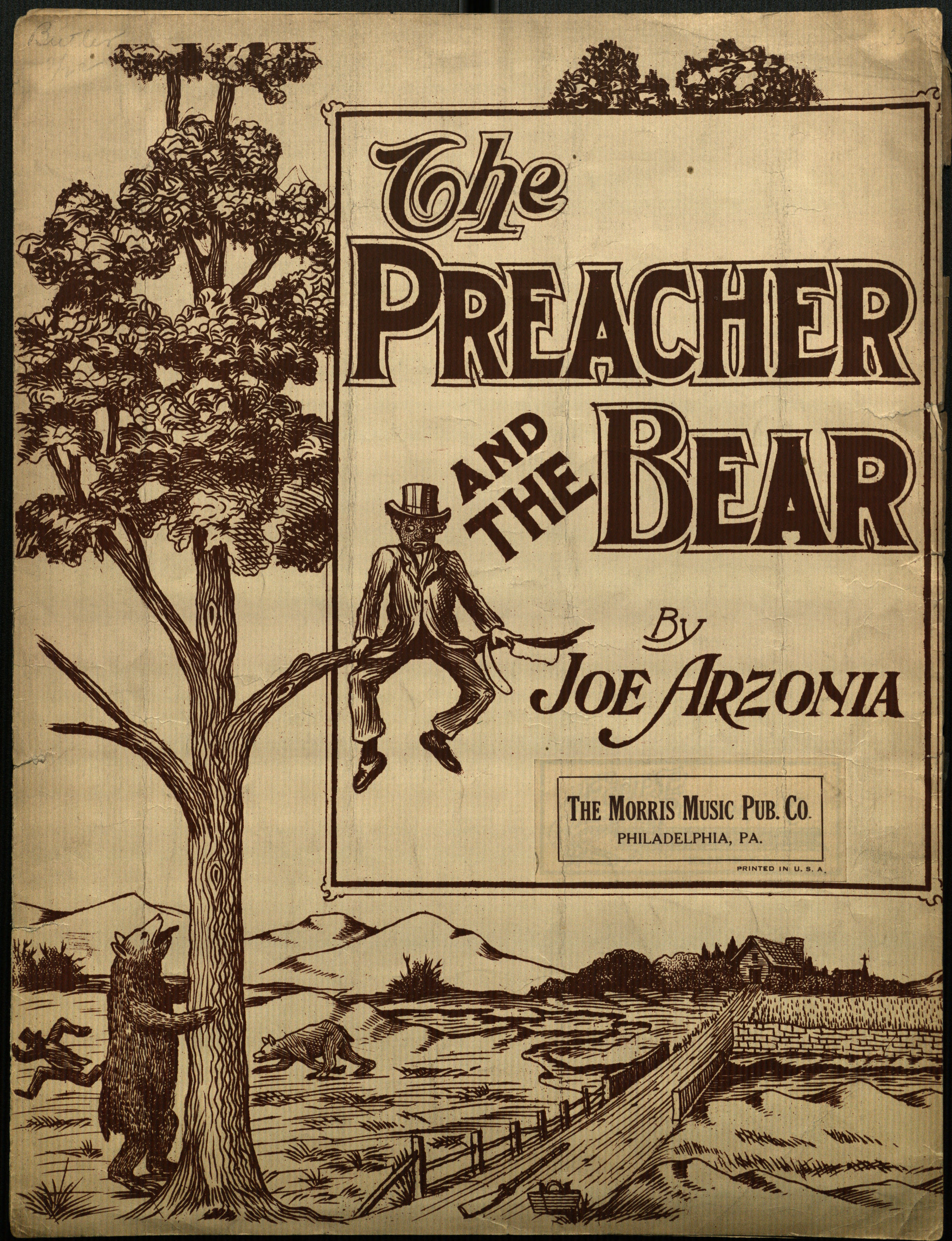
The Preacher and the Bear cover

"The Preacher and the Bear" is an American popular song, originally a "coon song". The lyrics recount the story of a church pastor who appeals to God after being treed by a grizzly bear while out hunting on the Sabbath. He falls out of the tree and has to fight the bear. Various versions have been recorded.

George Fairman wrote the song. Sheet music was published for it by Capitol Music House of Columbus, Ohio in 1904. Publisher Arthur Longbrake composed the song using the pseudonym Joe Arzonia. Ragtime artist Arthur Francis Collins recorded the song in 1905 and it became a huge hit, selling over a million records. He continued performing and recording the song for various records over several decades. Sheet music for the song was also published in 1905 by Joseph Morris. The song was later recorded by various artists including Phil Harris in 1947, The Jubalaires, and Jerry Reed on his album Georgia Sunshine. It was also recorded by the Golden Gate Quartet.

The University of Arkansas' Ozark Folksong Collection has a 1962 recording from Jasper, Arkansas, of an a capella version with racial slurs included in the lyrics.
