= Arthur Longbrake =

- Origin: United States
- Occupations: Songwriter and Lyricist

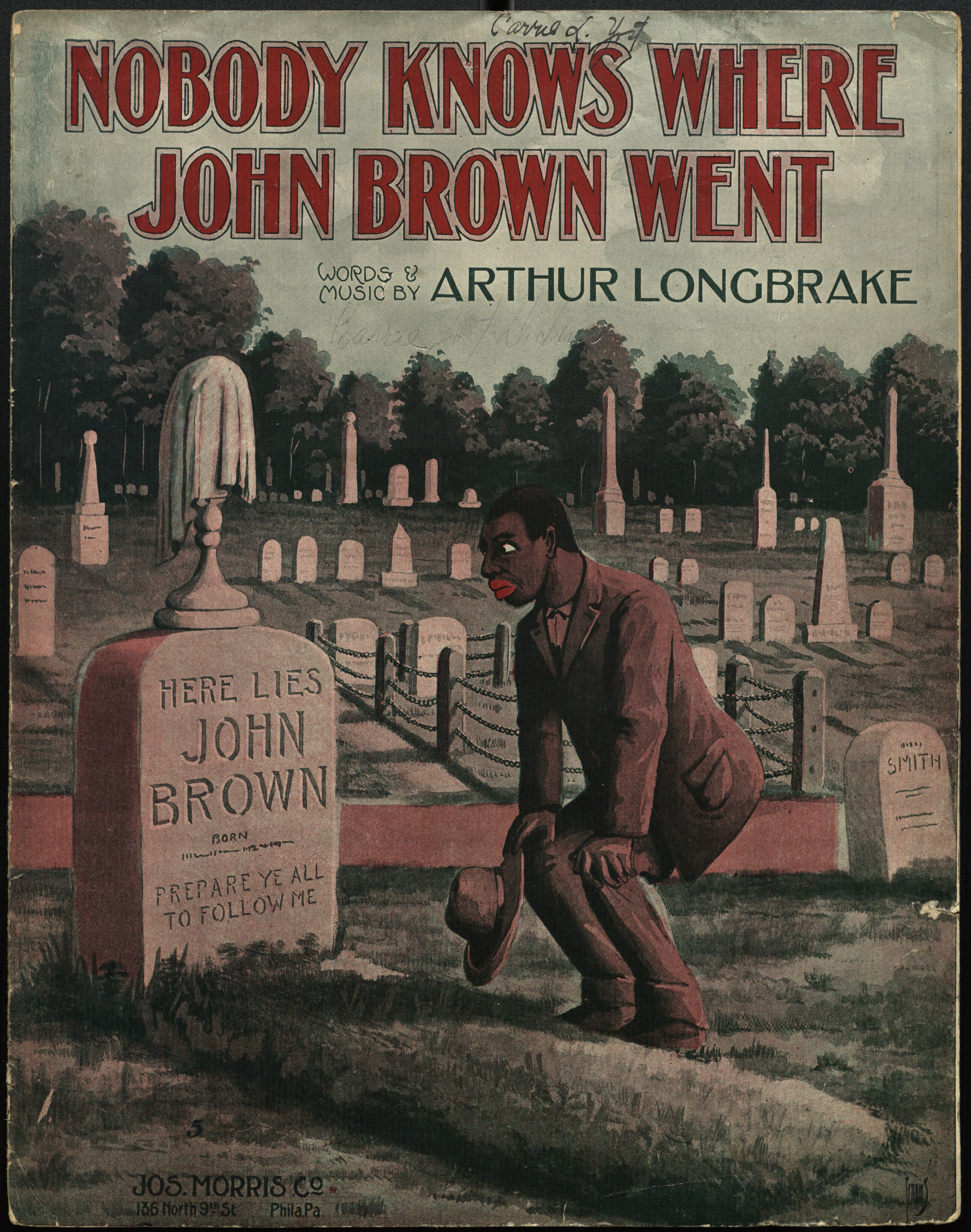

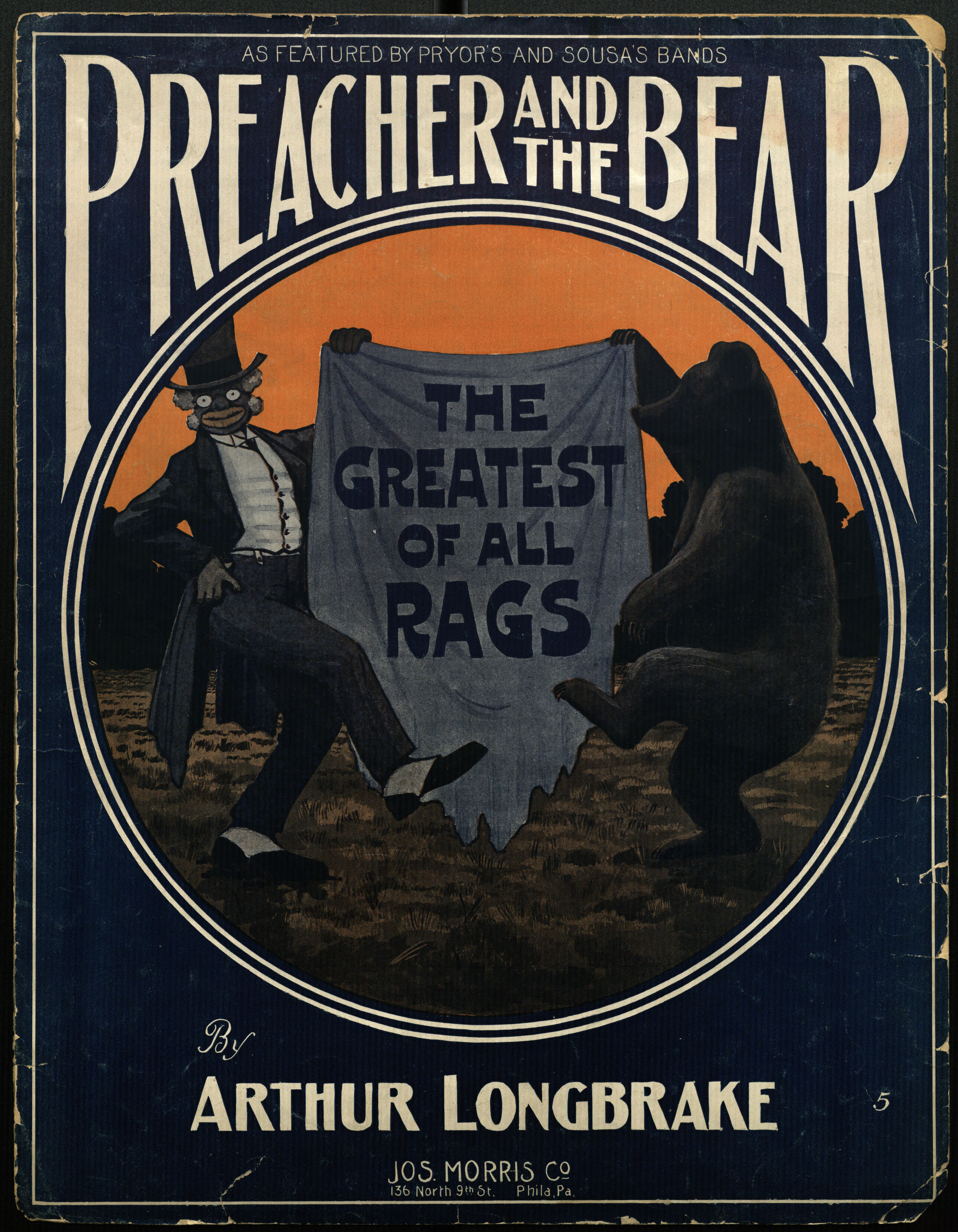
Cover for The Preacher and the Bear

Arthur Longbrake was an American songwriter and lyricist. He established the Eclipse Music Company. He wrote the words to "I'd like to know where I met you" and "On the Beach 'Neath the Old Willow Tree".

"Brother Noah Gave Out Checks for Rain" recounts the story of a church deacon with a leaky roof and a baseball game with Biblical figures.

Several performances of the songs he wrote were recorded with Arthur Collins singing them. They are minstrel songs. Joseph Morris published several.

Arthur Collins recorded "Nobody Knows Where John Brown Went".

== Songs ==
- "Brother Noah Gave out Checks for Rain" (1907)
- "Come Down and Pick Your Husband Out, the Rest of Us Want to Go Home" (1909), lyrics
- "Fever's On" (1906), lyrics
- "Honey I Will Long For You" (1910), lyrics by Arthur Longbrake and music by Ed. Edwards
- "I am Longing for Tomorrow When I Think of Yesterday", lyrics
- "I'd Like to Know Where I Met You", lyrics by Arthur Longbrake and music by A. Jackson Peabody Jr.
- "It Was Your Pleasing Smile" (1909), lyrics
- "It's Morning (The Song with the Rooster Crow)" (1908)
- "My Affinity" (1908)
- "Nobody Knows Where John Brown Went"
- "Parson Jones' Three Reasons" (1908)
- "Powder River, let's go; song foxtrot
- "Rose of the Night" (1917), lyrics
- "Singing Bird" (1909), lyrics
- "When the Sunshine in your Heart Turns Night Into Day" (1908), lyrics
- "When You're Dreaming Dream of Me" (1906), lyrics
- "You're Going on a Long, Long Journey Soon", words by Arthur Longbrake and music by Arthur Hauk

== See also ==
- Coon song
