= The Ragtime Soldier Man =

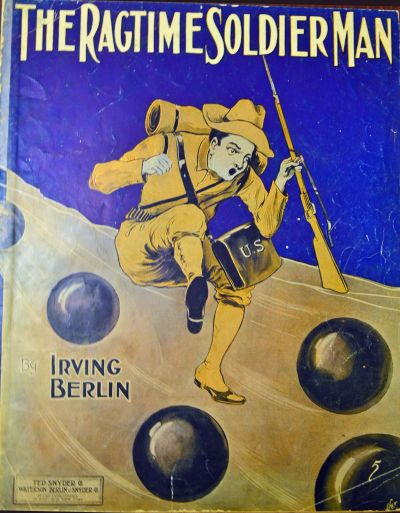

Song
- Released: 1912, 1917
- Songwriter: Irving Berlin

"The Ragtime Soldier Man" is a World War I–era song released in 1912 and 1917. Irving Berlin wrote the lyrics and composed the music, basing it off his 1911 song "Alexander's Ragtime Band". The song was published by Waterson, Berlin & Snyder, Co. of New York, New York. Artist Pfeiffer designed the sheet music cover. It features a U.S. soldier holding his rifle and jumping over cannon balls. The song was written for voice and piano.

Arthur Collins and Byron G. Harlan recorded the song and it was released in 1912 by Victor Records and Columbia Records. It was also recorded by Edward Meeker in 1913 for Edison Records.

The sheet music can be found at Pritzker Military Museum & Library.

== Chorus ==
The song is about a soldier eager to leave his sweetheart and fight in the war. He tells her to stop grieving, and understand that he has to fight for "love and liberty." The choruses are as follows:

Chorus:

I've got to go, I've got to go,
A soldier man I've got to be;
I've got to go, I've got to go,
I hear the bugle calling me.
Oh my hon, hurry up, hurry up,
Get my gun, hurry up, hurry up, hurry up.
Can't you see that
I've got to fight for love and liberty?
My honey dear,
My honey dear,
You better save your sympathy;
If you should hear;
If you should hear,
I got too near the enemy,
Kindly carry me back to old Virginia,
And when you get me there
Say a prayer for your ragtime soldier man.

Earlier version of the chorus:

My honey, can't you hear that bugle calling me?
It means that I must go and fight for my country.
Hear that drum-get away, get away
Hear them come-get away, get away
I must run with my gun to the front,
Where I can fight for love and liberty.
If you should hear a cannonball rolled under me,
Why, then you'll know I got too near the enemy.
Oh my hon, hurry up, hurry up,
Get my gun, hurry up, hurry up,
You better say goodbye to your lovin'
Ragtime soldier man

Another earlier version of the chorus:

The bugle call, the bugle call,
The bugle call is calling me;
I've got to fall, I've got to fall,
I've got to fall in line, you see.
Hear they come-let me go, let me go.
Hear that drum-let me go, let me go.
Hear them calling me-they're calling me
To fight for love and liberty;
If you should hear, if you should hear:
A cannonball rolled under me,
You'll know, my dear, you'll know, my dear,
I got too near the enemy.
Oh my hon, hurry up, hurry up,
Get my gun. hurry up, hurry up,
Come and say goodbye to your
Ragtime soldier man
