= Joseph Morris (music publisher) =

- Occupation: Musical publisher

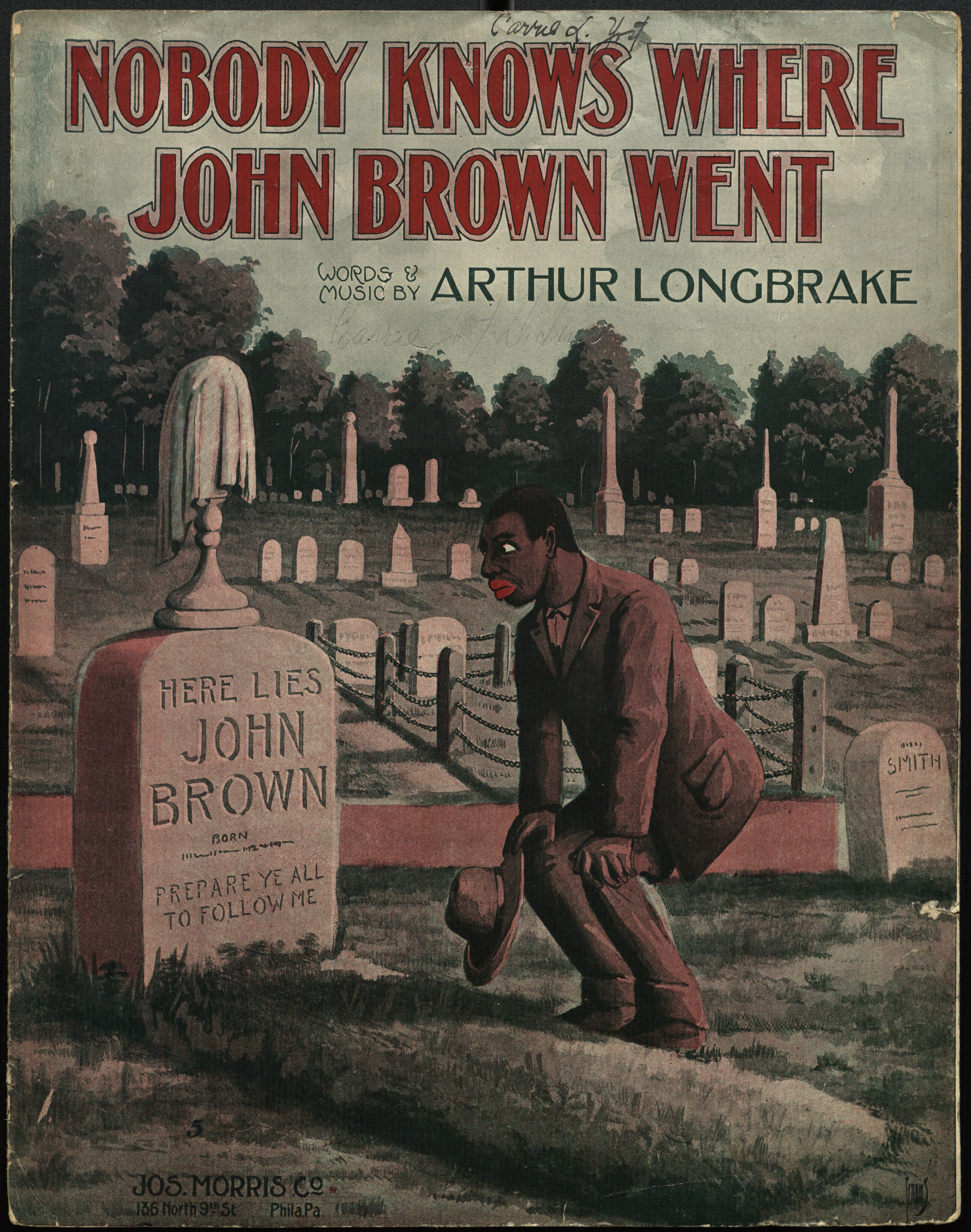

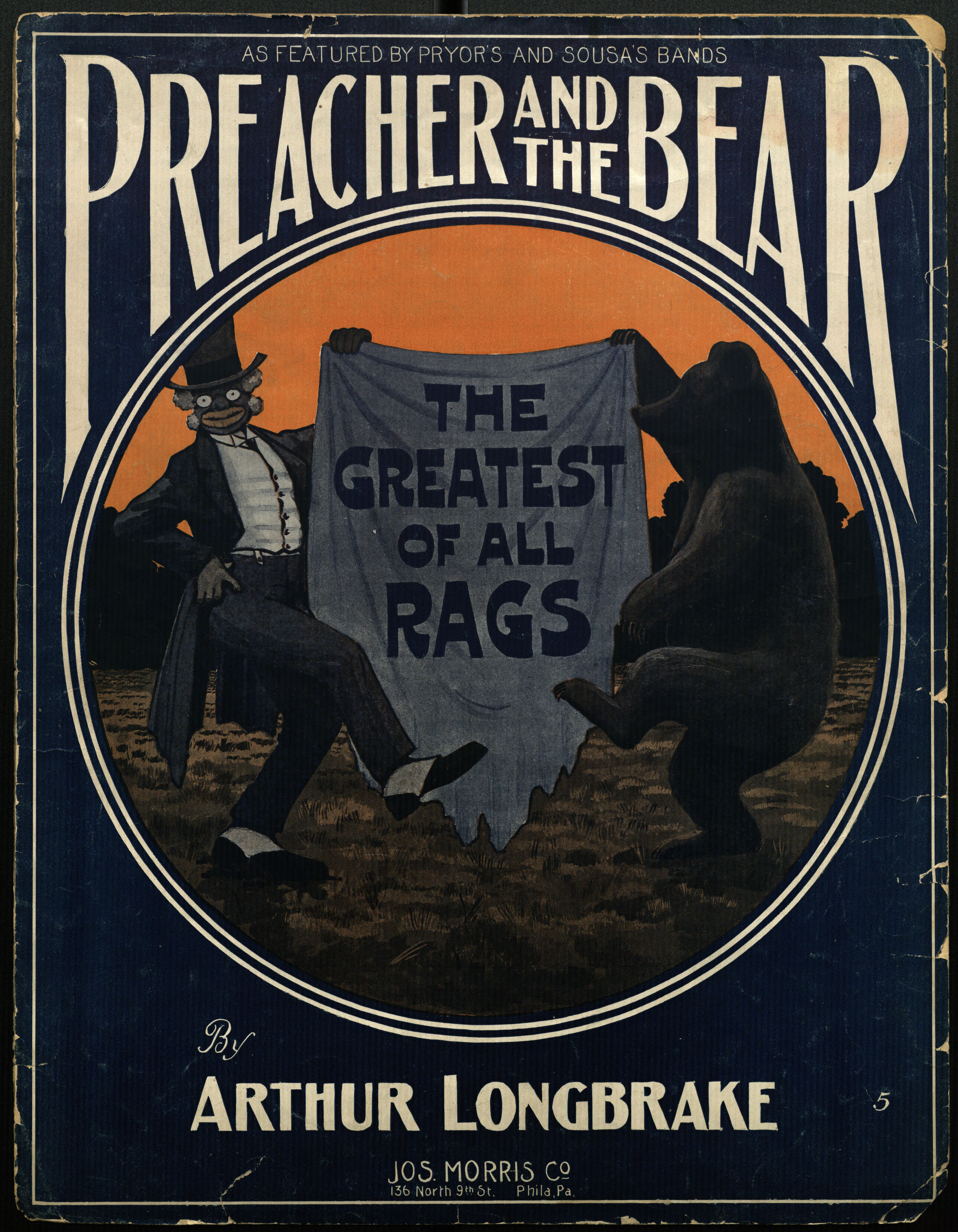
Cover for The Preacher and the Bear

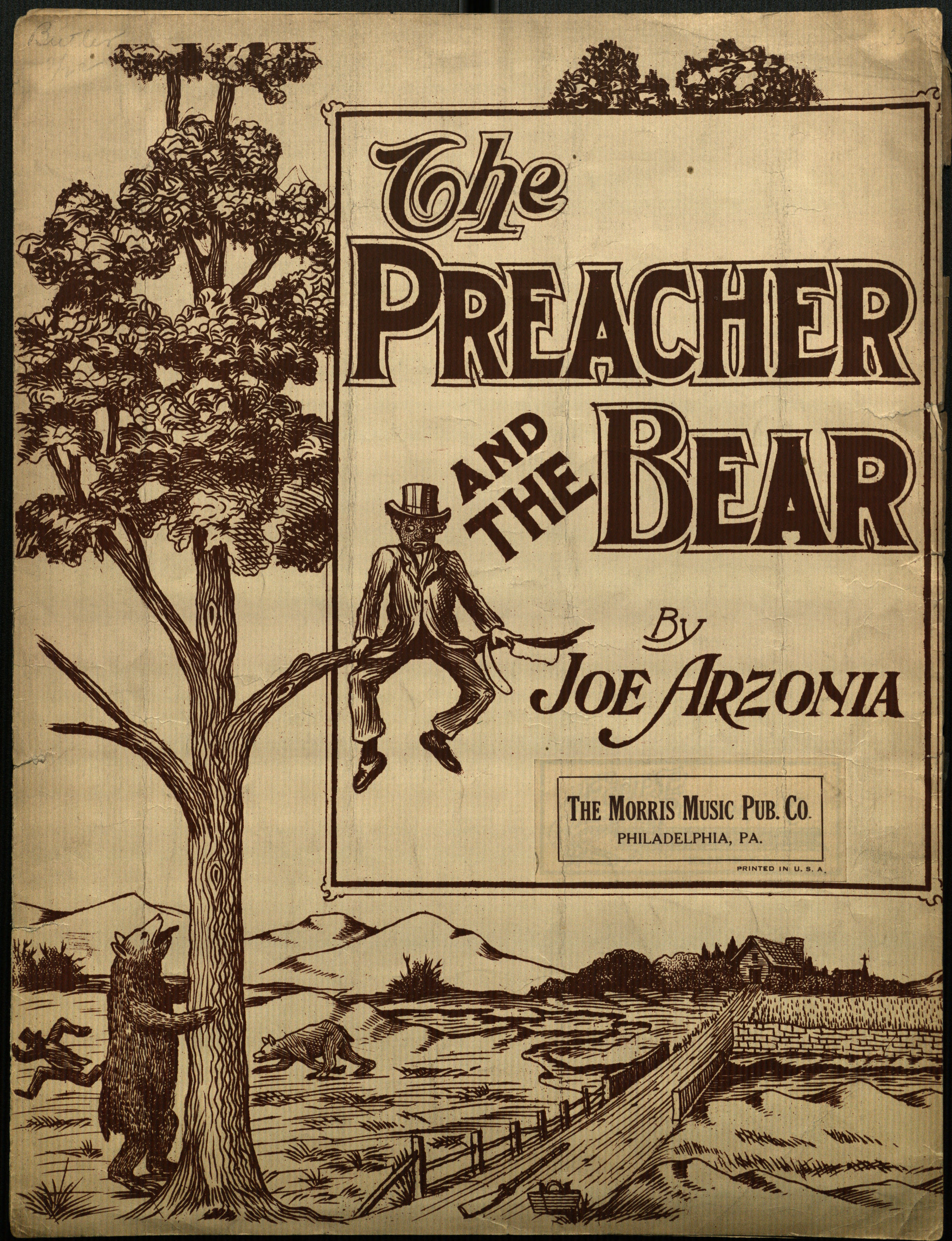
The Preacher and the Bear cover

Joseph Morris was an American publisher of songsheet in Philadelphia during the early 20th century. The Library of Congress has several of his published works in its catalog and others in various collections of musical documents.

Morris published several of Arthur Longbrake's songs.

== Songsheet publications ==
- "Preacher and the Bear" by Arthur Longbrake
- "The Hall of Fame", music by John Dillon and words by Harry Dillon
- "The Story of Two Floral Wreaths" by Tom Waters, "Sung with great success by Henry and Young."
- "You're Going on a Long, Long Journey Soon", words by Arthur Longbrake and music by Arthur Hauk
- "'Neath the Lines of Vermont" by Horace Strouse
- "Singing Bird"; Indian Intermezzo by Ed Edwards
- "I'd Like to Know Where I Met You", lyrics by Arthur Longbrake and music by A. Jackson Peabody Jr.
- "Nobody Knows Where John Brown Went" by Arthur Longbrake
- "Brother Noah Gave Out Checks for Rain", "The Great Baseball Song", music and lyrics by Arthur Longbrake. Cover features an image of Ed Morton and a bigoted depiction of African Americans with exaggerated features playing baseball
- If I Only Had A Sweetheart (1908) by J. E. Dempsey
- "Chop Sticks Waltz" by Arthur De Zulli (Euphemia Allen)
- "Missouri Rag" by W. C. Powell (1907)
