= The Old Gray Mare =

American folk song

Single by Prince's Orchestra
- Released: 1917
- Genre: Folk
- Label: Columbia

"The Old Gray Mare" (Roud 751) is an American folk song, more recently regarded as a children's song.

== History ==
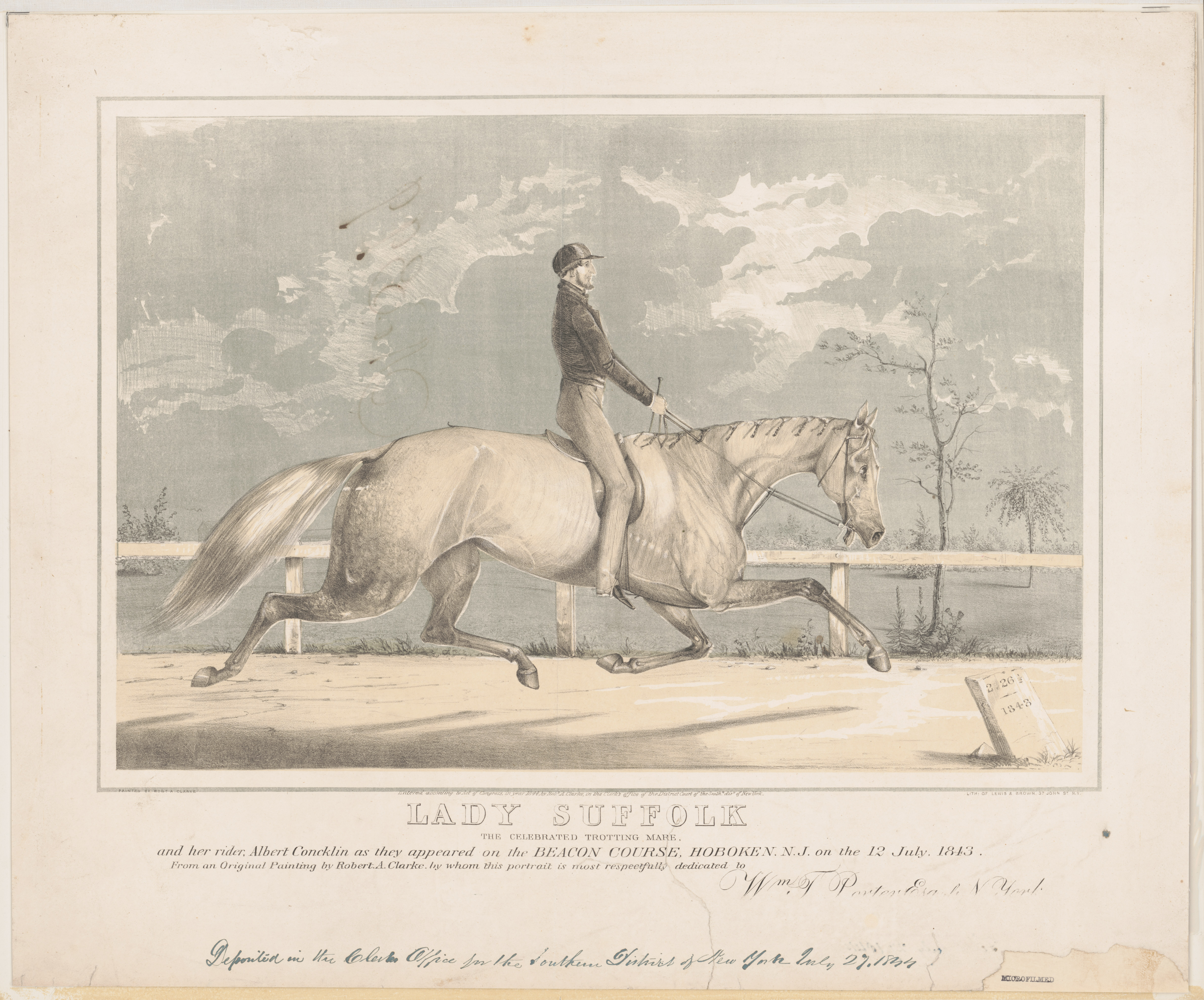
Lady Suffolk, the celebrated trotting mare, and her rider, Albert Concklin as they appeared on the Beacon Course, Hoboken, N. J. on the 12 July 1843.

Some authors have said that the song originated from the performance of the horse Lady Suffolk, the first horse recorded as trotting a mile in less than two and a half minutes. It occurred on 4 July 1843 at the Beacon Course racetrack in Hoboken, New Jersey, when she was more than ten years old. One author attributed the song to Stephen Foster, although the composer is usually listed as unknown. The archival evidence, however, is that the song originated a few decades later in the nineteenth century as a campaign ditty, composed as an epithet of seven-term Baltimore mayor Ferdinand Latrobe by Democratic political operative and appointee Thomas Francis McNulty.

Popular early recordings were by Prince's Orchestra (1917) and by Arthur Collins and Byron Harlan (1918). Bing Crosby included the song in a medley on his album On the Sentimental Side (1962).

== In popular culture ==
For the 1962 TV play Flashing Spikes, when Jimmy Stewart's visiting team of retired baseball players gets off their tour bus, the home team crowd taunts them by singing the song.

The song was featured in a 1993 episode of The Simpsons titled "Krusty Gets Kancelled", where an old man sings the first verse of the song with his pants down and becomes a hit on television. In the 2011 episode "Moms I'd Like to Forget", 4th graders including Bart sing a parody of the song, which the 5th graders declare as a dishonor to the original. Also, in a 2017 episode, the title "The Old Blue Mayor She Ain't What She Used to Be", is a play on words of the song's title.

It is also used as the secondary fight song for the Murray State Racers athletic teams.

== Lyrics ==
The old gray mare, she ain't what she used to be,
Ain't what she used to be, ain't what she used to be,
The old gray mare, she ain't what she used to be,
Many long years ago.

Many long years ago, many long years ago,

The old gray mare, she ain't what she used to be,
Many long years ago.

The old gray mare, she kicked on the whiffletree,
Kicked on the whiffletree, kicked on the whiffletree,
The old gray mare, she kicked on the whiffletree,
Many long years ago.

Many long years ago, many long years ago,

The old gray mare, she kicked on the whiffletree,
Many long years ago.

- (Note that "mule" is sometimes substituted for "mare".)
- (A whiffletree is a force-distributing mechanism in the traces of a draft animal. As an energetic younger horse, the mare still had the spirit to kick even though she was harnessed up to pull a plow or similar.)

== Pattern ==
The repetitive pattern of the song is common to many traditional folk songs, including "London Bridge is Falling Down". The melodic system of the two songs is also similar, with the middle of the three repetitions of the phrase being sung to a similar melody, but down a scale degree. The melody has also been used in American songs such as "Ain't I Glad I Got out the Wilderness" and "Ain't You Glad You Joined the Republicans", and in turn is related to the melody of the spiritual "Go in the Wilderness".

== See also ==
- "We Don't Give a Damn"
- "Great Green Gobs of Greasy, Grimy Gopher Guts"
