= Joe Natus =

American recording artist (1860–1917)

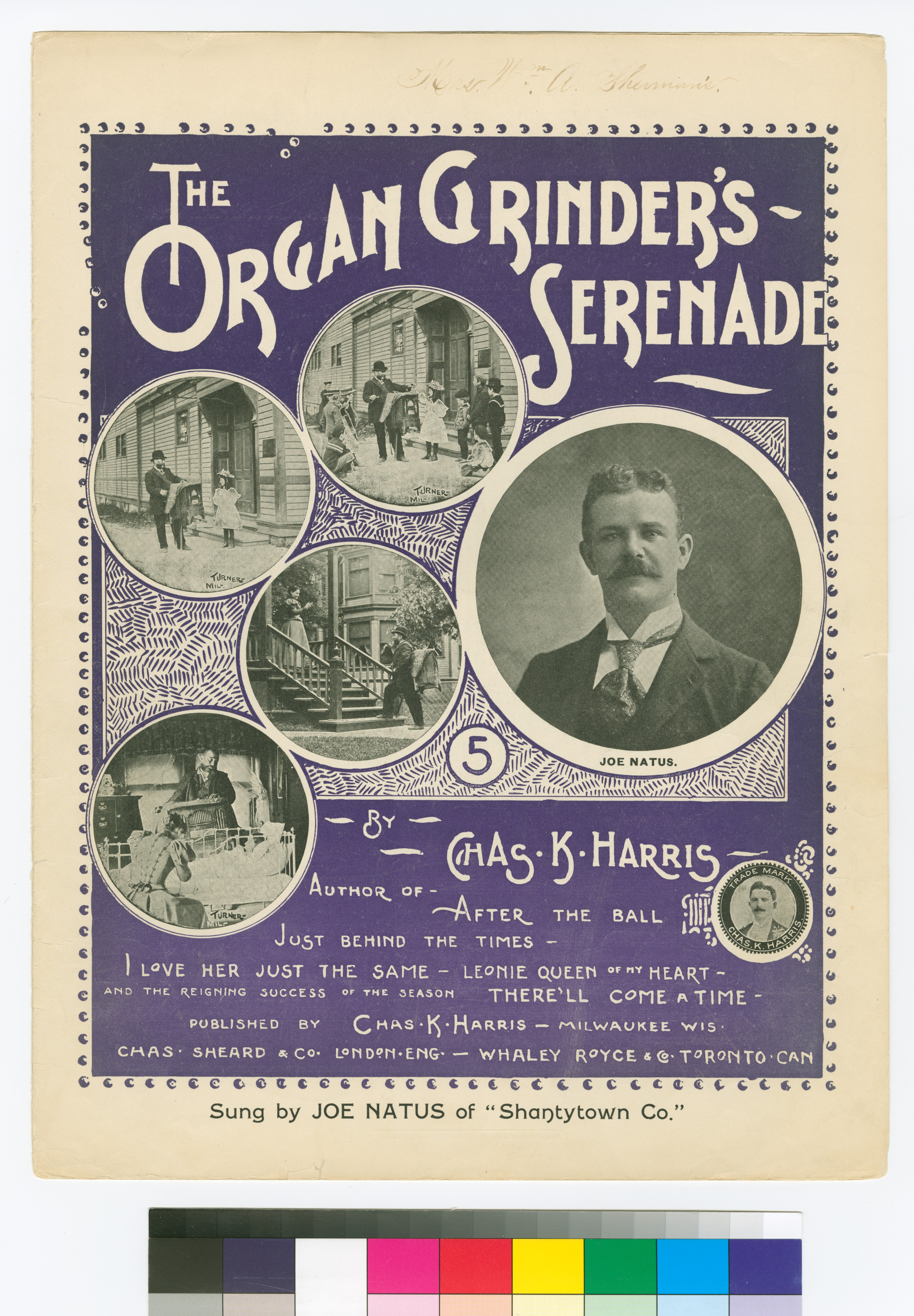

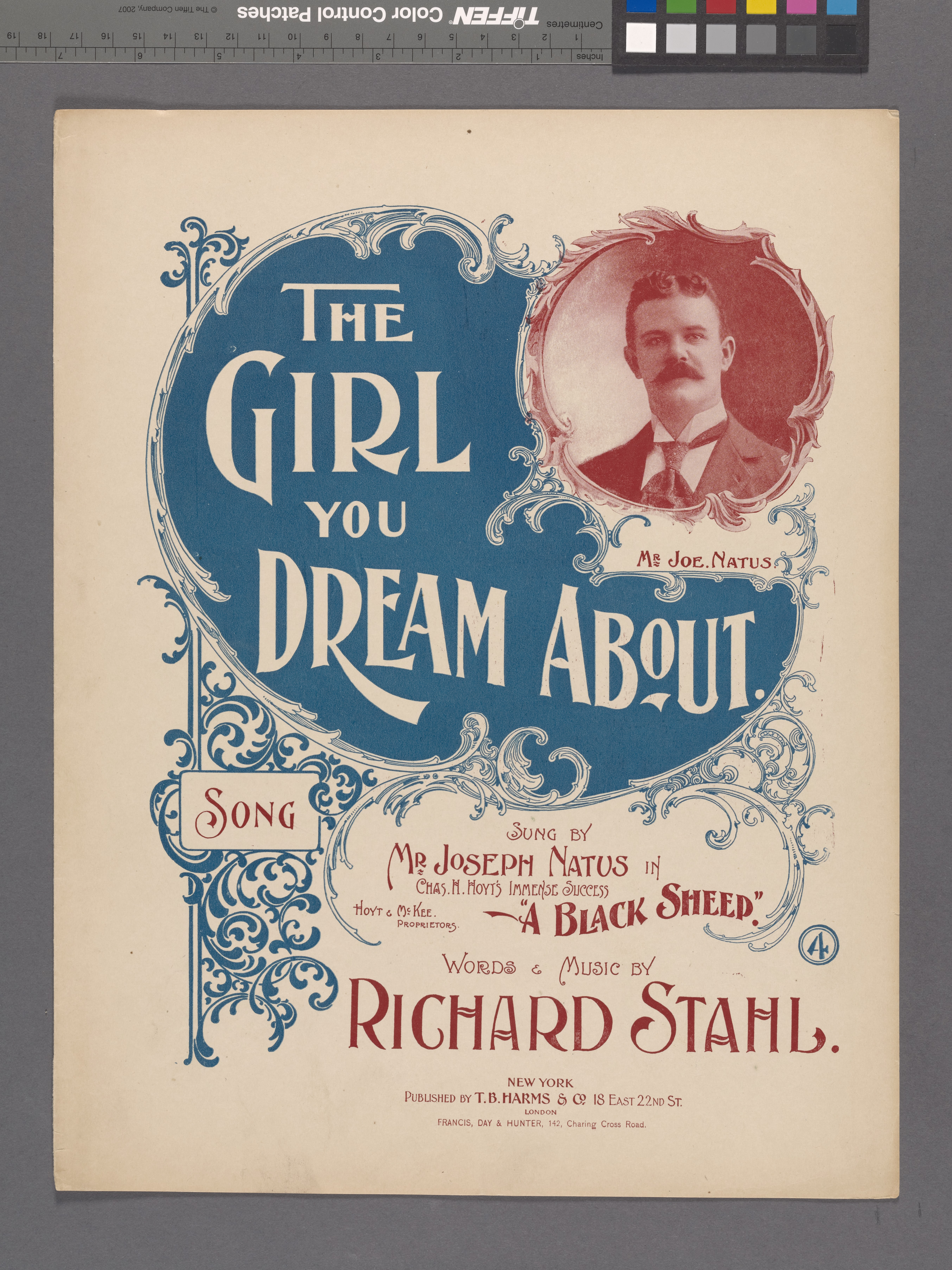

Joseph Natus (March 1, 1860 – April 21, 1917) was an American minstrel performer and recording artist who was prominent during the early 20th century. He was a tenor.

He was born in Detroit, Michigan.

He partnered with Arthur Collins in 1901 and they made 19 Edison cylinder recording and several Victor recording through 1902. They also recorded as part of a quartet, including a performance of the song Goodbye, Dolly Gray that was popular.

Natus also recorded a version of the song Coon, Coon, Coon.

He died April 21, 1917, in Rome, New York. discographies are not complete, and DHAR (the source of nearly all records below) can be accessed to see the full discography.

== Edison Discography ==
- “I'm longing in my heart for you Louise“
- “Home sweet home”
- "All for a man whose god was gold"
- "a bird in a gilded cage"
- "Give us just another lincoln"
- “The Fatal Rose Of Red”

== Berliner discography ==
- "the blue and the gray"
- "in good old new york town"
- "you're the only one"
- "Ruth"
- "sweet savannah"

== victor discography ==
- "My lonesome little Louisiana lady"
- "She rests by the Suwanee River" (7 &10 inch recordings)
- "There is no North or South to-day" (7 &10 inch recordings)
- "I'd still believe you true" (7 &10 inch recordings)
- "All for a man whos god was gold" (7 &10 inch recordings)
- "calling to her boy just once again"
- "Where the Mississippi flows" (7 &10 inch recordings)

== columbia discography ==
- "I'll be with you when the roses bloom again"
- "Tell us pretty ladies" (with arthur collins)

== Zonophone ==
- "little tillie twinkle"
- "back, back, back to the woods (with arthur collins)
- "could you be true to eyes of blue?"

== from sheet music covers ==
- The girl you dream about
