= Arthur Collins (singer) =

American musician and actor (1864–1933)

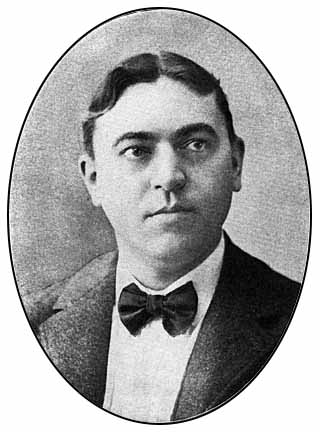
- Portrait of Collins, 1904

Background information
- Born: Arthur Francis Collins; February 7, 1864; Philadelphia, Pennsylvania, U.S.
- Died: August 2, 1933 (aged 69) Tice, Florida, U.S.
- Genre: Ragtime
- Occupation: Singer
- Years active: 1898–1926
- Labels: Victor, Edison
- Formerly of: Collins & Harlan, Peerless Quartet

Arthur Francis Collins (February 7, 1864 – August 2, 1933) was an American baritone and actor. One of the pioneer recording artists, regarded in his day as "king of the Ragtime Singers", Collins was popular from the late 1880s to the late 1910s.

== Biography ==
Collins was born in Philadelphia, Pennsylvania, and moved with his family to Barnegat, New Jersey, around 1879 and as a teenager worked as a volunteer lifeguard on the Jersey shore, beginning an enthusiasm for sailing that became a lifelong pursuit. However, his fine baritone voice – heard in church and in local concert appearances – convinced Collins's family to send him back to Philadelphia for formal training. After concluding his studies, Collins spent some 15 years touring with various stock companies and appearing in summer opera in St. Louis. None of these ventures turned out any long term prospects for Collins, and when he married actress and singer Anna Leah Connelly in 1895, Collins swore off show business and decided to study for a career in bookkeeping. Taking occasional roles for extra money, Collins appeared in a production given by the DeWolf Hopper Opera Company in 1898, and talent scouts for Edison Records requested Collins audition which, according to his wife, took place on May 16, 1898.

Within a few years, Collins proved one of the most productive and successful singers in the record business, and in his long career between 1898 and 1926, he worked for every record company active in the United States. He specialized in what were then called coon songs; popular African-American dialect numbers associated with vaudeville and minstrel shows. Collins also utilized an array of vocal effects and caricature voices which gave the impression that there were multiple persons at the horn on his recordings, though it was just Collins. Towards making that end of it more effective, Collins began to work in a duo format with tenor Joe Natus in 1901 and both sang in an Edison group called the Big Four Quartet. It is assumed that Collins first came into contact with tenor Byron G. Harlan within the context of the Big Four Quartet, and from then until the end of Collins's career in the early 1920s, Harlan was Collins's duet partner. Collins & Harlan were probably the most famous and popular male duo on early records.

In 1909, Collins joined John H. Meyer, Henry Burr, and Albert Campbell in the Peerless Quartet, a successful barbershop music group which toured as the Record Makers, and later as the Eight Popular Victor Artists. However, by 1917, bass Frank Croxton began to replace Collins on some records, a situation that became permanent by mid-1919 as Collins did not get along with Burr, who also served as the group's manager.

During a personal appearance at the Princess Theater in Medina, Ohio on October 20, 1921, Collins was badly injured when he fell through an open trap door. While he recovered well enough to resume his singing and recording career, his health began to decline afterward and, in 1926, Collins retired, relocating to Florida with his wife. He died at the age of 69 in Tice, Florida on August 2, 1933.

== Recordings and legacy ==
Arthur Collins recorded hundreds of songs, and in many cases he recorded the same song multiple times for various recording outfits. His signature song was Arthur Longbrake's "The Preacher and the Bear", which he first recorded in 1905. His rendition, widely dispersed among a variety of releases, constitutes the most popular non-operatic record made during the first decade of the twentieth century. Collins was still recording the number in 1922, and a 1908 remake of the piece for Victor remained in their catalog until 1941; at his personal appearances "The Preacher and the Bear" was invariably requested. His recording sold over one million copies, and was awarded a gold disc, only the second one ever presented.

"Alexander's Ragtime Band" (1911)
The 1911 recording by singing duo Arthur Collins and Byron G. Harlan which became a smash hit due to its intentionally comedic elements.

Collins lived up to his reputation as the "King of Ragtime Singers" and recorded more ragtime songs than any other singer during the era when ragtime was at its peak of popularity. Collins recorded some of Bert Williams's songs before Williams did, and even recorded some numbers associated with Williams that the latter never waxed. Collins and Harlan also made best-selling records of tunes such as "Waiting for the Robert E. Lee", "Alexander's Ragtime Band", "Lily of the Valley", and "The Old Grey Mare". Collins survived into the early years of the Jazz Age, and he and Harlan recorded the earliest record known to mention jazz, "That Funny Jas Band from Dixieland" (Victor 18235, recorded January 12, 1917).

His song "Steamboat Bill" is referenced in both the 1928 film Steamboat Bill, Jr. and the first sound Mickey Mouse cartoon (1928), Steamboat Willie, in which Mickey whistles the tune.

Some of his songs can be listened to online.

== Selected discography ==
Hello! Ma Baby
"Hello! Ma Baby" sung by Arthur Collins in 1899.

I Didn't Raise My Boy to Be a Soldier
"I Didn't Raise My Boy to Be a Soldier" (1914) featuring Collins as a baritone.

That Funny Jas Band from Dixieland
"That Funny Jas Band from Dixieland" sung by Collins in 1916.

=== 1890s ===
1898

- "Happy Days in Dixie"
- "Zizzy Ze Zum Zum"

1899

- "All Coons Look Alike to Me" (Edison 7317)
- "When You Ain't Got No More Money" †
- "Hello! Ma Baby"†
- "I'd Leave My Happy Home For You" †
- "I Guess I'll Have To Telegraph My Baby" †
- "Kiss Me, Honey Do" †
- "Mandy Lee"^{†} – number five song of 1900 †
- "My Josephine"

=== 1900s ===
1900

- "Ma Tiger Lily" – number three song of 1900 †
- "My Sunflower Sue" with The Metropolitan Orchestra, Victor's house orchestra
- "You're Talking Rag Time"
- "I Ain't Seen No Messenger Boy"

1901

- "Ain't Dat a Shame"
- "Coon, Coon, Coon"
- "Every Darky Had A Raglan On"
- "I Dreams About You"

1902

- "Any Old Place I Can Hang My Hat Is Home Sweet Home To Me"
- "(Won't You Come Home) Bill Bailey" – number two song of 1902 †
- "Down Where the Wurzburger Flows" †
- "Helen Gonne"
- "Just Kiss Yourself Goodbye"
- "Under the Bamboo Tree" †

1903

- "Any Rags?"– number four song of 1903 †
- "Good-bye, Eliza Jane" †
- "I'm A Jonah Man"
- "I Wonder Why Bill Bailey Don't Come Home"

1904

- "The Preacher and the Bear"^{†} – number one song of 1905 and Collins's best-selling song
- "Hannah, Won't You Open That Door"
- "Scissors to Grind"

1905

- "Have You Seen My Henry Brown?"
- "My Irish Molly O"
- "Nobody"
- "What You Goin' to Do When De Rent Comes 'Round?"
- "Who's There"
- "Robinson Crusoe's Isle"

1906

- "Abraham Jefferson Washington Lee"
- "Bill Simmons"
- "The Ghost of a Banjo Coon"
- "Jessamine"
- "Pretty Desdamone"
- "What's the Use of Knocking When a Man is Down?"
- "When A Poor Relation Comes to Town"

1907

- "Dixie Dan"
- "If I'm Going to Die, I'm Going to Have Some Fun"
- "Moses Andrew Jackson Good Bye"
- "Bake dat chicken pie"

1908

- "The Old-time Rag"
- "I Think I See My Brother Coming Home"
- "Rag Babe"
- "Nothin' Ever Worries Me"

1909

- "Abraham Lincoln Jones, or, The Christening"
- "Everybody's Pickin' on Me"
- "I Love, Love, Love My Wife, but Oh You Kid!"
- "Strawberries"
- "That's a Plenty"

=== 1910s ===
1910

- "Moonlight in Jungle Land"
- "If He Comes In, I'm Goin' Out"
- "No One Loves A Fat Man"
- "Temptation Rag"

1911

- "Play That Barbershop Chord"
- "Chicken Reel"
- "Railroad Rag"
- "Steamboat Bill"

1912

- "The Ragtime Goblin Man"
- "The Ragtime Soldier Man"
- "Row! Row! Row!"
- "Rum Tum Tiddle"
- "Somebody Else Is Getting It"

1913

- "That Baseball Rag"

1916

- "If You've Got a Little Bit"

1918

- "When Tony Goes Over The Top"

1919

- "Climbing Up the Golden Stairs"
- "Suicide Blues"

=== 1920s ===
1920

- "Old Man Jazz"
- "The Argentines, the Portuguese and the Greeks"

==== 1924 ====
- "Go 'Long, Mule"

† Indicates a recording that reached number one on sales charts.
