= We Don't Give a Damn =

American folk song

"We Don't Give a Damn for the Whole State of Michigan" is a song long associated with opponents of sports teams from the American state of Michigan. Its simple lyrics, written in the first person plural, repeatedly express the indifference of its performers to the entirety of the state of Michigan and declare their place of origin to be some other location. The earliest known usage of the song was in the 1890s by alumni of Cornell University. It has also been used in a variety of contexts by baseball and football fans from Chicago, Minnesota, Ohio, North Carolina, and Tennessee (primarily during the Johnny Majors coached years).

"We Don't Give a Damn" is set to the melody of the American folk song "The Old Gray Mare".

== History ==
The song dates back at least to the 1890s and was used in multiple variations and contexts.

In 1896, a group of Cornell alumni gathered in Chicago and sang a song with the following lyrics: "We don't give a ---- For the whole State of Michigan; We're from Illinois."

During the 1907 World Series, fans of the Chicago Cubs celebrated their team's victory over the Detroit Tigers by running onto the field and singing: "We don't give a rap for the whole State of Mich-i-gan, whole state of Michigan, whole state of Michigan, we're from Illinois."

The song appears to have been popularized as a college football song in the context of the Little Brown Jug rivalry between the Universities of Michigan and Minnesota. In November 1923, Minnesota fans paraded through the streets of Ann Arbor "crying at the top of their voices their new battle cry of 'We don't give a d-mn for the whole state of Michigan for today the Gophers will show it some new things in football." In November 1925, Minnesota fans sang the song in preparation for the annual rivalry game, using the lyrics: "We don't give a [deleted by censor] For the whole State of Michigan The whole State of Michigan The whole State of Michigan."

In December 1926, the Lansing State Journal reported that the singing of "We don't give a damn for the whole state of Michigan" to the tune of "The Old Gray Mare" had become common practice at football games among "gay collegians of other states."

In October 1928, the Detroit Free Press reported that, during a football game between Ohio Wesleyan and Michigan, the Ohio Wesleyan band played "that old familiar air, 'We Don't Give a D--m for the Whole State of Michigan'" as it marched onto the field. The song was credited with inspiring Ohio Wesleyan to upset the Wolverines, 17 to 7. According to another account, Ohio Wesleyan coach George Gauthier, a Michigan State alumnus, led his team in singing the song in the locker room before the 1928 game began.

More recently, the song became associated with the Michigan–Ohio State football rivalry. Some sources incorrectly assert that the lyrics were written in the 1920s when an inebriated supporter of the Ohio State football team began spontaneously vocalizing it in a hotel in Columbus, Ohio, as an organic expression of hostility towards Michigan, and was joined in chorus by several other intoxicated individuals. A 1933 article in the Akron Beacon Journal reports that the song was, at that time, a "familiar" one at Ohio State fraternities and sororities.

The song was performed in the 1940 play The Male Animal, written by Ohio State University alumni James Thurber and Elliott Nugent, and subsequently turned into a in the 1942 motion picture of the same name. The song is performed in the play by supporters of the fictitious Midwestern University in advance of their American football contest against the University of Michigan.

The lyrics are changed by fans of the North Carolina Tar Heels to reflect its rivalry with the Duke Blue Devils (see Carolina-Duke rivalry). The new relevant lyrics become "We don't give a damn 'bout Duke University, 'cause we're from Carolina".

The song is set to the melody of the American folk song "The Old Gray Mare".

== Performance ==
Singing of "We Don't Give a Damn" often occurs spontaneously among groups of people – generally alumnae or supporters of the Ohio State University – wishing to express hostility towards Michigan including "at any point during a sporting event, at any bar on campus, or really at any establishment in the state of Ohio".
