= Alexander's Ragtime Band =

1911 song composed by Irving Berlin

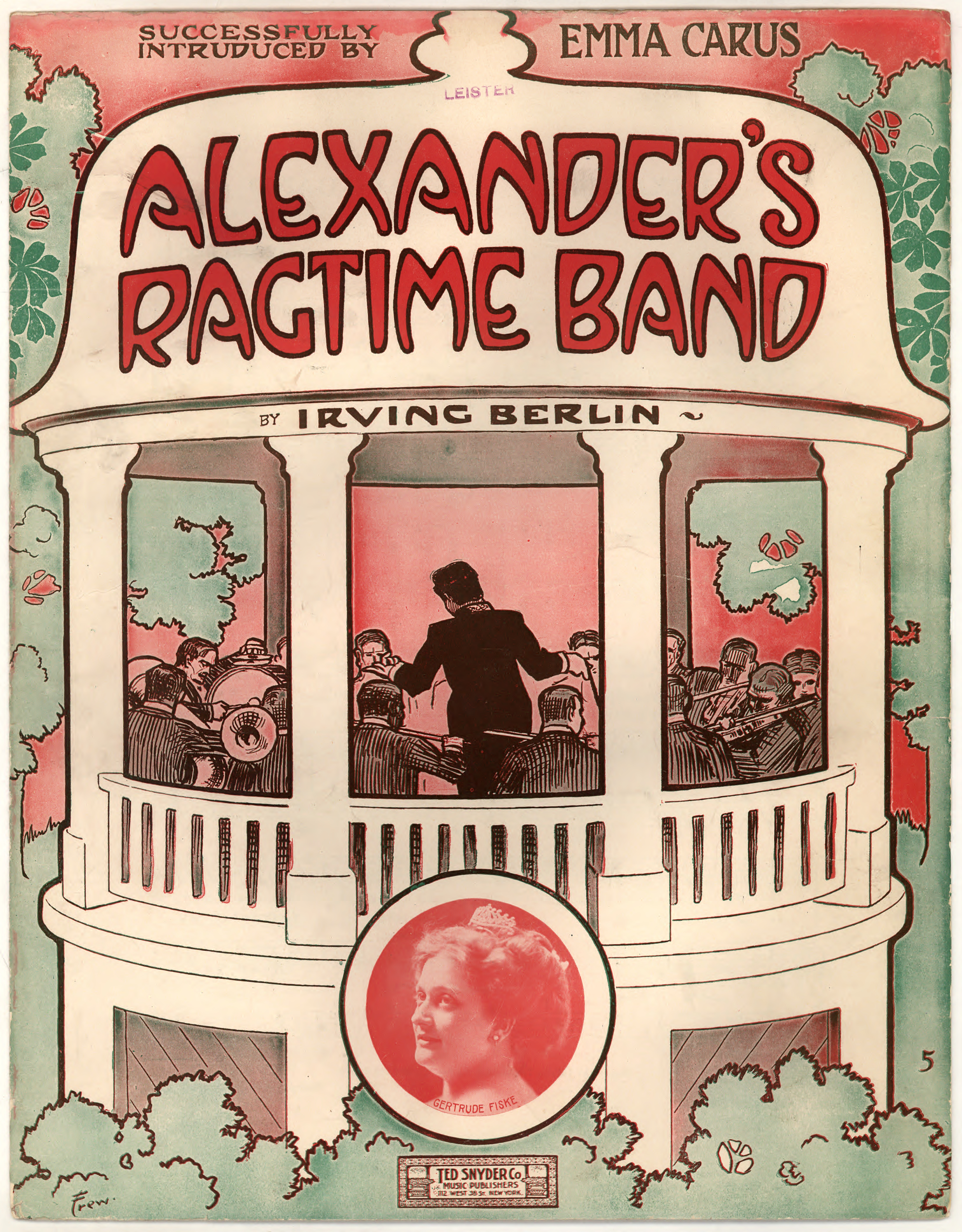
- Cover of 1911 sheet music, featuring contralto Emma Carus, by artist John Frew

Single by Arthur Collins & Byron G. Harlan
- Language: English
- A-side: "Ocean Roll" by Eddie Morton
- Published: March 18, 1911 (sheet music registration) by the Ted Snyder Company
- Recorded: May 23, 1911 (phonograph recording)
- Studio: Victor Records
- Venue: Camden, New Jersey
- Genre: March; rag
- Length: 3:03
- Label: Victor 16908
- Songwriter: Irving Berlin

"Alexander's Ragtime Band" is a Tin Pan Alley song by American composer Irving Berlin released in 1911; it is often inaccurately cited as his first global hit. (Note: Hamm 2012, p. 38: "'Alexander's Ragtime Band' was not Irving Berlin's first commercial hit; a dozen or more of his songs had chalked up substantial sheet music sales before it was published early in 1911. It was not his first song to attract international attention.") Despite its title, the song is a march as opposed to a rag and contains little syncopation. The song is a sequel to Berlin's 1910 composition "Alexander and His Clarinet", recounting the reconciliation between an African-American musician, Alexander Adams, and his flame Eliza Johnson as well as highlighting Alexander's innovative musical style. (Note: Kaplan 2020, p. 41: "In May [1910], Snyder and Berlin published one of their own, 'Alexander and His Clarinet,' a... dialogue between a colored Romeo and his Juliet, with a barely submerged Freudian subtext: 'For lawdy sake [the female character sang], don't dare to go, / My pet, I love you yet, / And then besides, I love your clarinet.") Berlin's friend Jack Alexander, a cornet-playing African-American bandleader, inspired the title character.

Emma Carus, a vaudeville contralto renowned for her high lung power, introduced Berlin's song to the public in Spring 1911. Carus' brassy performance of "Alexander's Ragtime Band" at the American Music Hall in Chicago on April 18, 1911, electrified the audience, and she toured other metropolises such as Detroit and New York City with acclaimed performances that featured the catchy tune. Carus' tour showcased the song in the United States and contributed to its immense popularity.

Amid the success of Carus' national tour, the comedic duo of Arthur Collins and Byron G. Harlan released a phonograph recording of the song on May 23, 1911, which became the best-selling record in the United States for ten consecutive weeks. Berlin's jaunty melody "sold a million copies of sheet music in 1911, then another million in 1912, and continued to sell for years afterwards," and it became "the number one song from October 1911 through January 1912". Although not a traditional ragtime song, Berlin's composition kickstarted a ragtime jubilee—a belated celebration of the music which African-Americans had originated a decade prior in the 1890s. The positive international reception of "Alexander's Ragtime Band" led to a musical and dance revival known as "the ragtime craze".

Bessie Smith recorded a cover in 1927 which became one of the hit songs of that year, fifteen years after its first surge of popularity. It was popular again in 1934 with the release of a close harmony cover by the Boswell Sisters, and in 1938 with a musical film of the same name starring Tyrone Power and Alice Faye. A variety of artists covered the song, including Al Jolson, Billy Murray, Louis Armstrong, Bing Crosby, and others; there were at least a dozen hit covers within fifty years of its release.

== History ==
=== Composition and difficulties ===
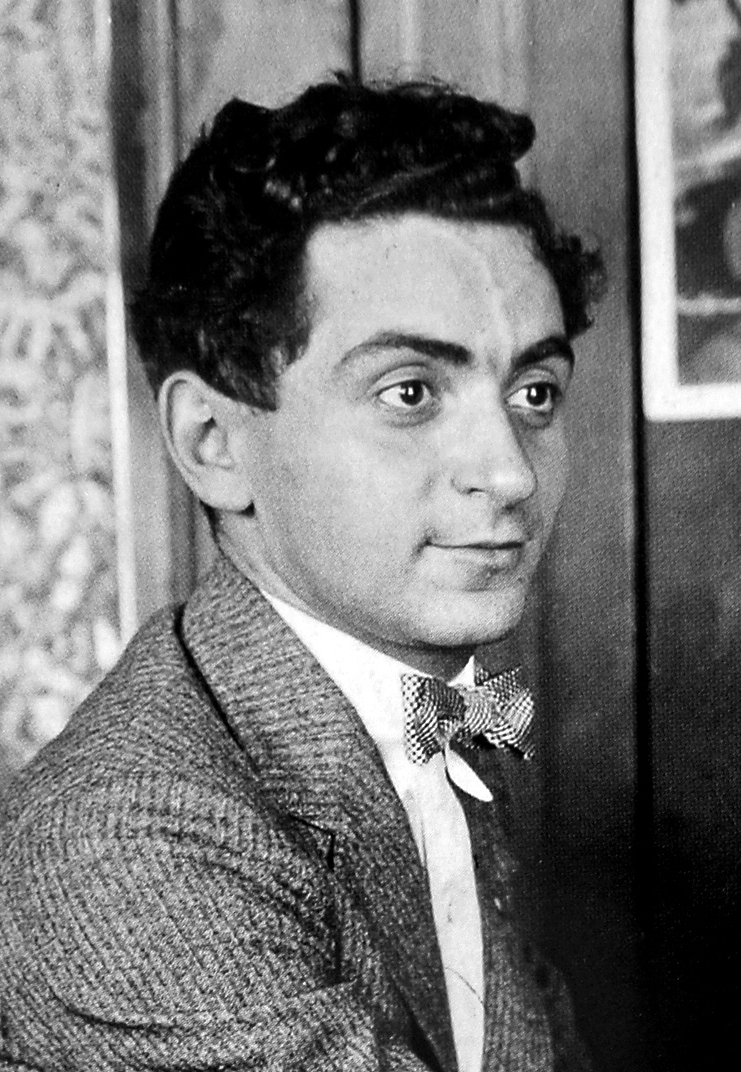
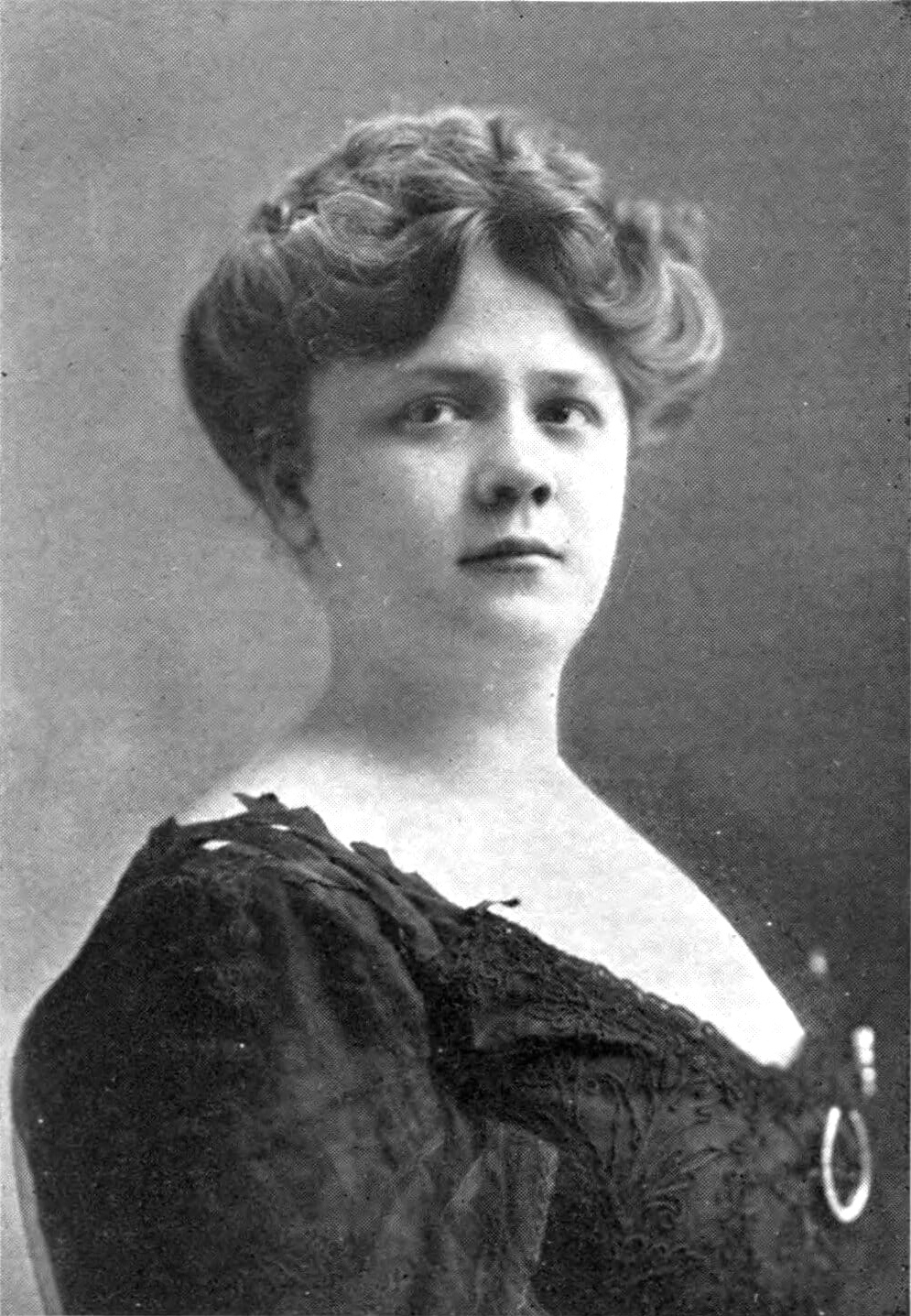
Composer Irving Berlin and singer Emma Carus

In March 1911, the Ted Snyder Company in New York City employed the 23-year-old Irving Berlin as a Tin Pan Alley songwriter. One morning after arriving at work, Berlin decided to compose an instrumental ragtime number. By this time, the ragtime phenomenon popularized by pianist Scott Joplin and other African-American musicians had begun to wane, and over a decade had passed since the syncopated genre's initial heyday in the Gay Nineties.

A tireless workaholic, Berlin composed the piece while in the noisy offices of Ted Snyder's music publishing firm where "five or six pianos and as many vocalists were making bedlam with songs of the day." Berlin composed the lyrics of the song as a narrative sequel to his earlier 1910 composition "Alexander and His Clarinet". This earlier composition recounts the reconciliation between an African-American musician named Alexander Adams and his flame Eliza Johnson as well as highlights Alexander's innovative musical style. Berlin's friend Jack Alexander, a cornet-playing African-American bandleader, inspired the title character.

By the next day, Berlin completed four pages of notes for the copyist-arranger. Berlin registered the song in the name of the Ted Snyder Company as E252990 and published it on March 18, 1911. Upon playing the composition for others, listeners criticized the song as too lengthy ("running beyond the conventional 32 bars"), too rangy, and not "a real ragtime number". In fact, the tune is a march as opposed to a rag and barely contains a trace of syncopation. Its sole notability consists of quotes from Swanee River and a bugle call. Due to such criticisms, the tune failed to impress listeners at the Ted Snyder Company.

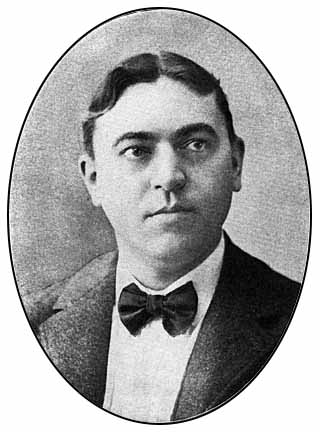
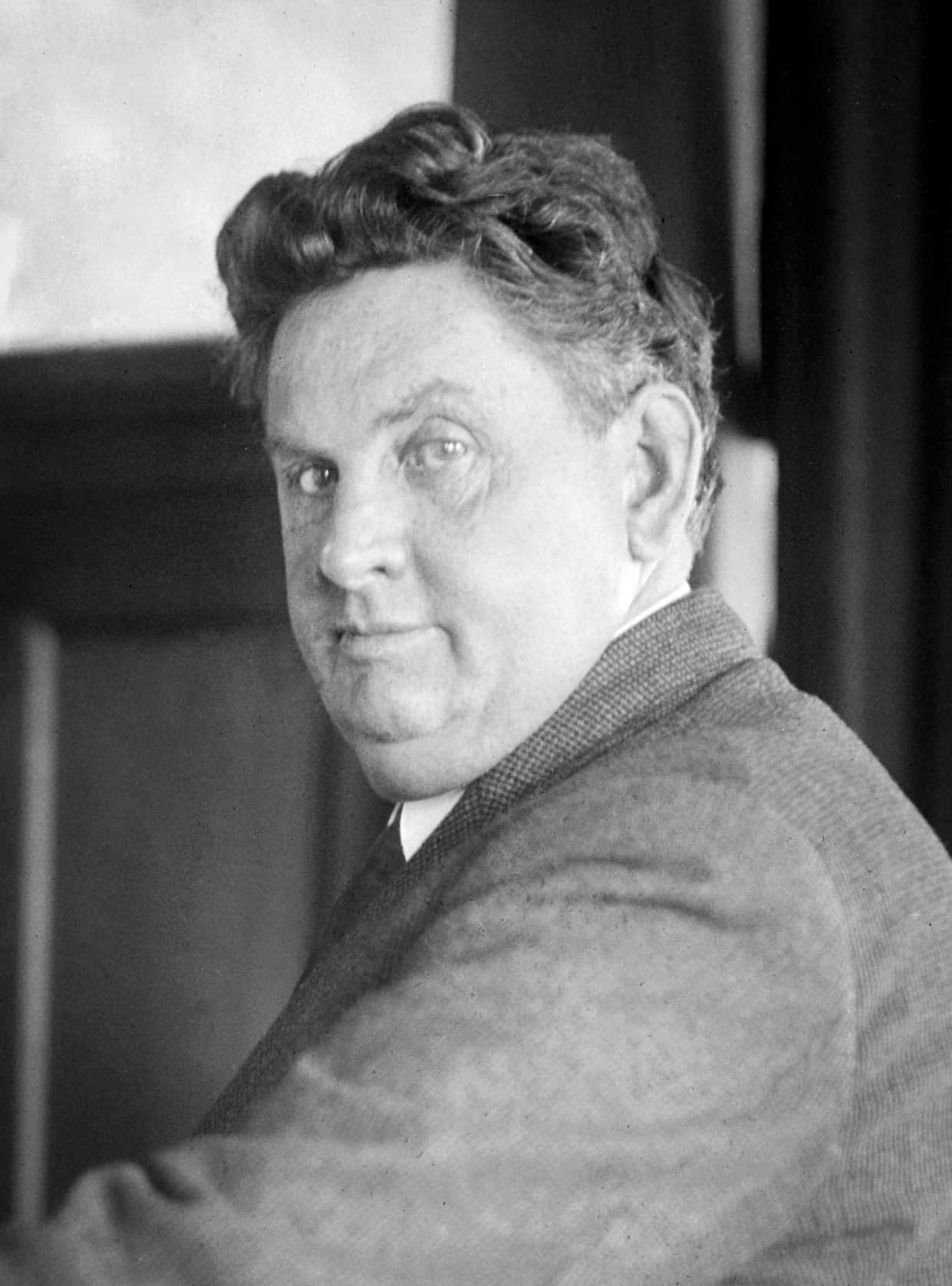
Collins & Harlan released the first phonograph recording of the song in May 1911.

Undaunted by the lackluster response, Berlin submitted the song to Jesse L. Lasky, a Broadway theater producer planning an extravagant debut for his nightclub theater called the Follies Bergère. Lasky hesitated to incorporate the pseudo-ragtime number into his show. When the show opened on April 27, 1911, Lasky chose only to use its melody whistled by performer Otis Harlan. Thus the song failed to find an appreciative audience.

Fortunately for Berlin, vaudeville singer and baritone Emma Carus liked his humorous composition, and she introduced the song on April 18, 1911, at the American Music Hall in Chicago. She next embarked on a tour of the Midwest in Spring 1911. Carus showcased the song to the country and helped contribute to its immense popularity. In gratitude, Berlin credited Carus on the cover of the sheet music. The catchy song became linked with Carus in the public consciousness, although rival performers such as Al Jolson later co-opted the hit tune.

"Alexander's Ragtime Band" (1911)
The May 23, 1911, recording by comedic duo Arthur Collins and Byron G. Harlan.

Amid the success of Carus' national tour, the comedic duo of Arthur Collins and Byron G. Harlan released a phonograph recording of the song on May 23, 1911, which became the best-selling record in the United States for ten consecutive weeks. Five days later, Berlin performed the song himself on May 28, 1911, in a special charity performance of the first Friars Frolic by the New York Friars Club at the New Amsterdam Theater. A fellow composer in attendance, George M. Cohan, instantly recognized the catchiness of the tune and told Berlin that the song would be a hit. Berlin's jaunty melody "sold a million copies of sheet music in 1911, then another million in 1912, and continued to sell for years afterwards." Alexander's Ragtime Band became "the number one song from October 1911 through January 1912."

=== Cultural sensation ===
A Meritorious Addition

In a few days, 'Alexander's Ragtime Band' will be whistled on the streets and played in the cafés. It is the most meritorious addition to the list of popular songs introduced this season. The vivacious comedienne [Emma Carus] had her audience singing the choruses with her, and those who did not sing, whistled.

— The New York Sun, May 1911

Although neither Irving Berlin's first commercial hit nor his first composition to attract international attention, "Alexander's Ragtime Band" nevertheless catapulted Berlin's career. American newspapers hailed Berlin's jumpy tune as the decade's musical sensation, and he became a cultural luminary overnight. An adoring international press touted him as the "King of Ragtime", an inaccurate title as the song "had little to do with ragtime and everything to do with ragtime audacity, alerting Europe to hot times in the colonies."

Baffled by this new title, Berlin insisted that he did not originate ragtime but merely "crystallized it and brought it to people's attention." Historian Mark Sullivan claimed that, with the auspicious debut of "Alexander's Ragtime Band", Berlin "lifted ragtime from the depths of sordid dives to the apotheosis of fashionable vogue."

Although not a traditional ragtime song, Berlin's jaunty composition kickstarted a ragtime jubilee—a belated popular celebration of the musical style which African-American composers such as Scott Joplin had originated a decade earlier in the 1890s. (Note: In a 1913 interview published in the black newspaper New York Age, Scott Joplin asserted that there had been "ragtime music in America ever since the Negro race has been here, but the white people took no notice of it until about twenty years ago [in the 1890s].") The positive international reception of "Alexander's Ragtime Band" in 1911 led to a musical and dance revival known as "the ragtime craze".

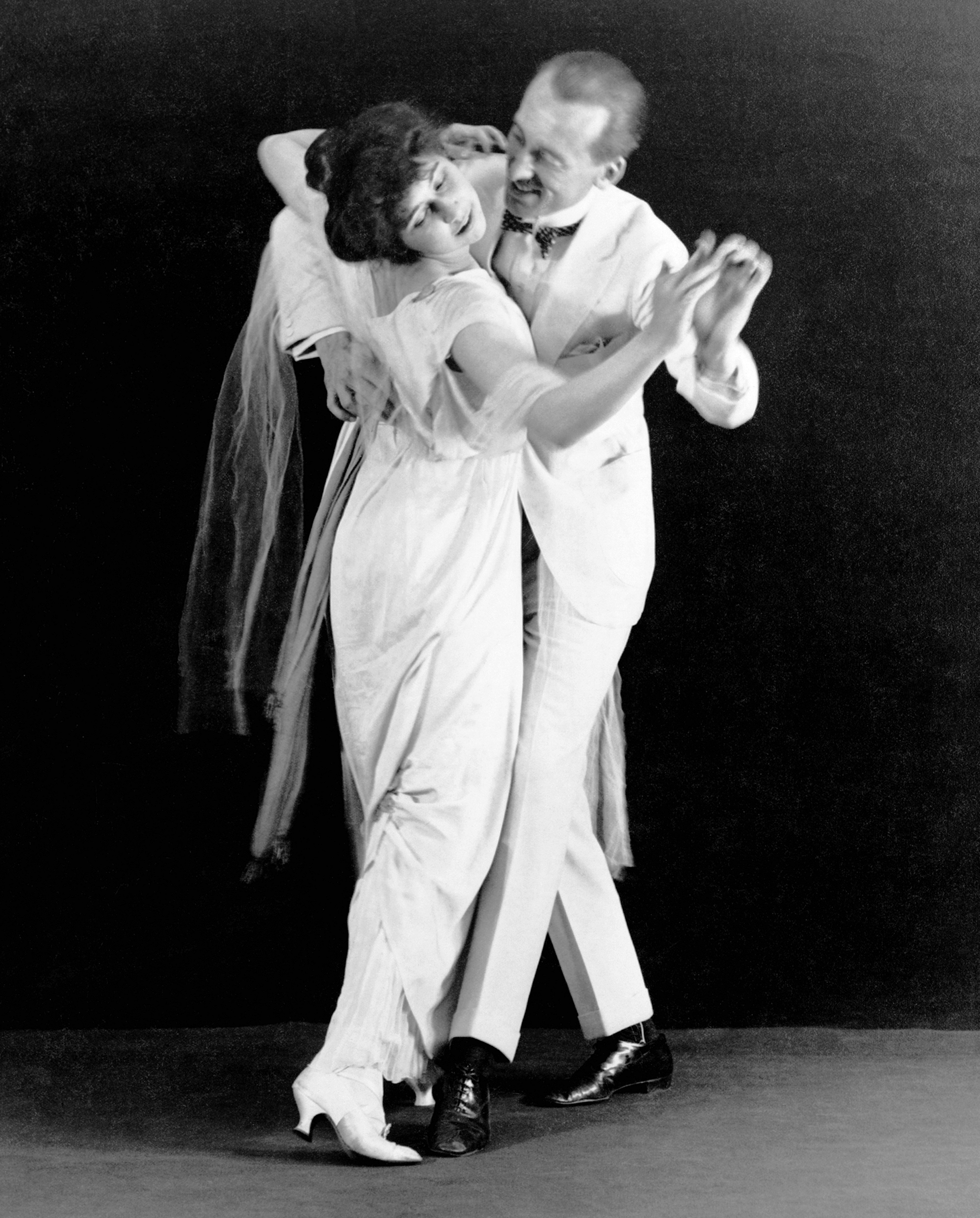
Irene and Vernon Castle, c. 1912

At the time, ragtime music caught "its second wind" and ragtime dancing spread "like wildfire." One dancing couple in particular who exemplified this faddish sensation were Vernon and Irene Castle. The charismatic, trendsetting duo frequently danced to Berlin's "Alexander's Ragtime Band" and his other modernist compositions. The Castles' modern dancing paired with Berlin's modern songs came to embody the ongoing culture clash between the waning propriety of the Edwardian era and the waxing joviality of the Ragtime revolution on the eve of World War I. The Daily Express wrote in 1913 that:

In every London restaurant, park and theater, you hear [Berlin's] strains; Paris dances to it; Vienna has forsaken the waltz; Madrid has flung away her castanets, and Venice has forgotten her barcarolles. Ragtime has swept like a whirlwind over the earth.

Writers such as Edward Jablonski and Ian Whitcomb have emphasized the irony that, in the 1910s, even the upper class of the Russian Empire—a reactionary nation from which Berlin's Jewish forebears had been compelled to flee decades earlier—became enamored with "the ragtime beat with an abandon bordering on mania." British socialite Lady Diana Cooper described Prince Felix Yusupov, an affluent Russian aristocrat who married the niece of Tsar Nicholas II and murdered Grigori Rasputin, as dancing "around the ballroom like a demented worm" and shouting, "More ragtime!"

Hearing of such behavior, commentators diagnosed such individuals as "bitten by the ragtime bug" and behaving like "a dog with rabies." They declared that "whether [the ragtime mania] is simply a passing phase of our decadent culture or an infectious disease which has come to stay, like la grippe or leprosy, time alone can show."

=== Continued popularity ===
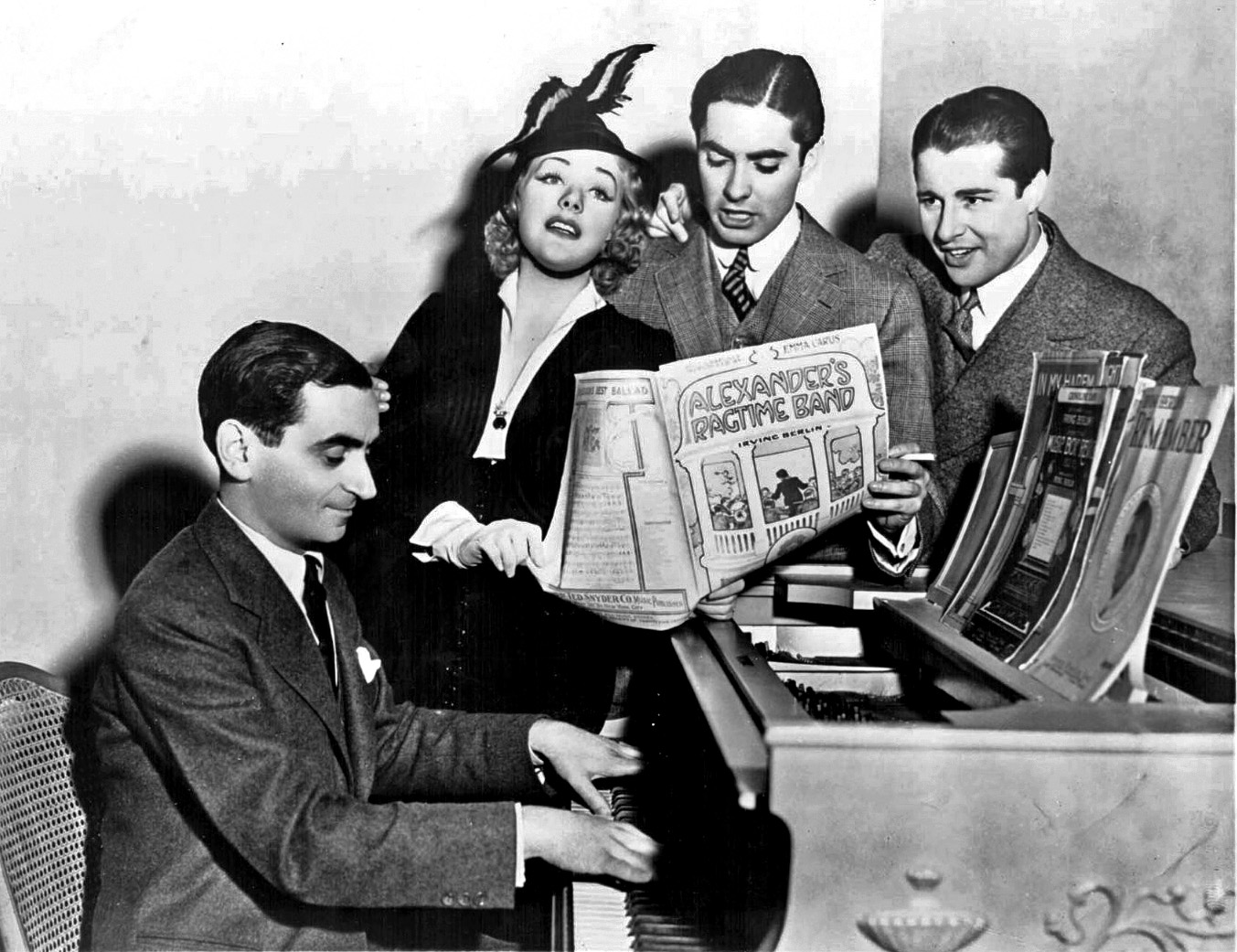
Publicity photograph of Irving Berlin with actors Tyrone Power, Alice Faye, and Don Ameche on the set of Alexander's Ragtime Band (1938).

As the years passed, Berlin's "Alexander's Ragtime Band" had many recurrent manifestations as many artists covered it: Billy Murray, in 1912; Bessie Smith, in 1927; Oswald the Lucky Rabbit, in 1930; the Boswell Sisters, in 1934; Louis Armstrong, in 1937; Bing Crosby and Connee Boswell, in 1938; Johnny Mercer, in 1945; Al Jolson, in 1947; Nellie Lutcher, in 1948, and Ray Charles in 1959. "Alexander's Ragtime Band" had a dozen hit covers within the half-century prior to 1960.

Reflecting decades later upon the song's unlikely success, Berlin confessed his amazement at its immediate global acclaim and continued popularity. He ascribed its unexpected success to the farcical lyrics which were "fundamentally right" and "started the heels and shoulders of all America and a good section of Europe to rocking."

In 1937, 20th Century Fox approached Irving Berlin to write a story treatment for an upcoming film tentatively titled Alexander's Ragtime Band. Berlin agreed to write a story outline for the film which featured twenty-six of Berlin's well-known musical scores.

"Alexander's Ragtime Band" (1927)
A 29-second sample of Bessie Smith's 1927 cover of the song.

"Alexander's Ragtime Band" (1934)
An unrestored sample of The Boswell Sisters's 1934 cover of the song.

During press interviews promoting the film prior to its premiere, Berlin decried articles by the American press that painted ragtime as jazz's forerunner. Berlin stated: "Ragtime really shouldn't be called 'the forerunner of jazz' or 'the father of jazz' because, as everyone will tell when they hear some of the old rags, ragtime and jazz are the same."

Released on August 5, 1938, Alexander's Ragtime Band, starring Tyrone Power, Alice Faye, and Don Ameche became a smash hit and grossed in excess of $5 million. After the film's release, writer Marie Cooper Dieckhaus sued Berlin for plagiarism. At the trial, she argued that Berlin had taken the plot of her unpublished 1937 manuscript and reused many of its elements in the film. She had circulated the manuscript in 1937 to various Hollywood studios, literary agents, and other individuals for their perusal. The judge ruled that Berlin, after rejecting her manuscript, appropriated her work. In 1946, an appellate court reversed the ruling on appeal.

== Alleged plagiarism ==
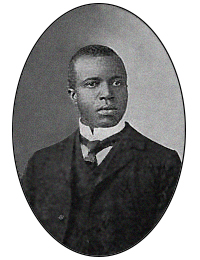
Scott Joplin alleged that Irving Berlin, an acquaintance, plagiarized the melody.

Allegations exist that Berlin purloined the melody for "Alexander's Ragtime Band", in particular, the four notes of "oh, ma honey", from drafts of "Mayflower Rag" and "A Real Slow Drag" by prolific composer Scott Joplin. Berlin and Joplin knew each other in New York, and Berlin had opportunities to hear Joplin's scores prior to publication. At the time, "one of Berlin's functions at the Ted Snyder Music Company was to be on the lookout for publishable music by other composers." Berlin allegedly "heard Joplin's music in one of the offices, played by a staff musician (since Berlin could not read music) or by Joplin himself." According to one account:

Joplin took some music to Irving Berlin, and Berlin kept it for some time. Joplin went back and Berlin said he couldn't use [the song]. When "Alexander's Ragtime Band" came out, Joplin said, "That's my tune."

Joplin's widow claimed that, "after Scott had finished writing Treemonisha, and while he was showing it around, hoping to get it published, [Berlin] stole the theme, and made it into a popular song. The number was quite a hit, too, but that didn't do Scott any good." A relative of John Stillwell Stark, Joplin's music publisher, asserted "the publication of 'Alexander's Ragtime Band' brought Joplin to tears because it was his [own] composition." Joplin died bankrupt after undertaking the financial burden of his unsuccessful Treemonisha opera and was buried in a pauper's grave (remaining unmarked for 57 years) in Queens, New York, on April 1, 1917. As writer Edward A. Berlin notes in King of Ragtime: Scott Joplin and His Era:

There were also rumors heard throughout Tin Pan Alley to the effect that Alexander's Ragtime Band had actually been written by a black man, and even a quarter-century later [composer] W.C. Handy told an audience that "Irving Berlin got all his ideas and most of his music from the late Scott Joplin." Berlin was aware of the rumors and addressed the issue in a magazine interview in 1916.

For the next half-century, Berlin was angered by the allegation that a "'black boy' [sic] had written 'Alexander's Ragtime Band'." Responding to his detractors, Berlin stated: "If a negro could write 'Alexander,' why couldn't I? ... If they could produce the negro and he had another hit like 'Alexander' in his system, I would choke it out of him and give him twenty thousands dollars in the bargain." In 1914, Berlin may have alluded to the allegation in a Peerless Quartet recording of his composition "He's A Rag Picker." The recording features a spoken line by Arthur Collins, possibly suggested by Berlin, in which a black character named Mose claims authorship of "Alexander's Ragtime Band."

== Lyrical implications ==
"Alexander's Ragtime Band" (1912)
A 1912 phonograph cylinder by vaudeville singer Billy Murray which includes the oft-omitted second verse.

Although the 1911 sheet music cover drawn by artist John Frew depicts the band's musicians as either white or biracial, Berlin's "Alexander's Ragtime Band" and his earlier 1910 composition "Alexander and His Clarinet" employ certain idiomatic expressions ("oh, ma honey", "honey lamb") and vernacular English ("bestest band what am") in the lyrics to indicate to the listener that the characters in the song should be understood to be African-American. For example, an often-omitted second verse identifies the race of Alexander's clarinet player as an African-American:

There's a fiddle with notes that screeches
Like a chicken—like a chicken—
And the clarinet is a colored pet.

== Sheet music ==
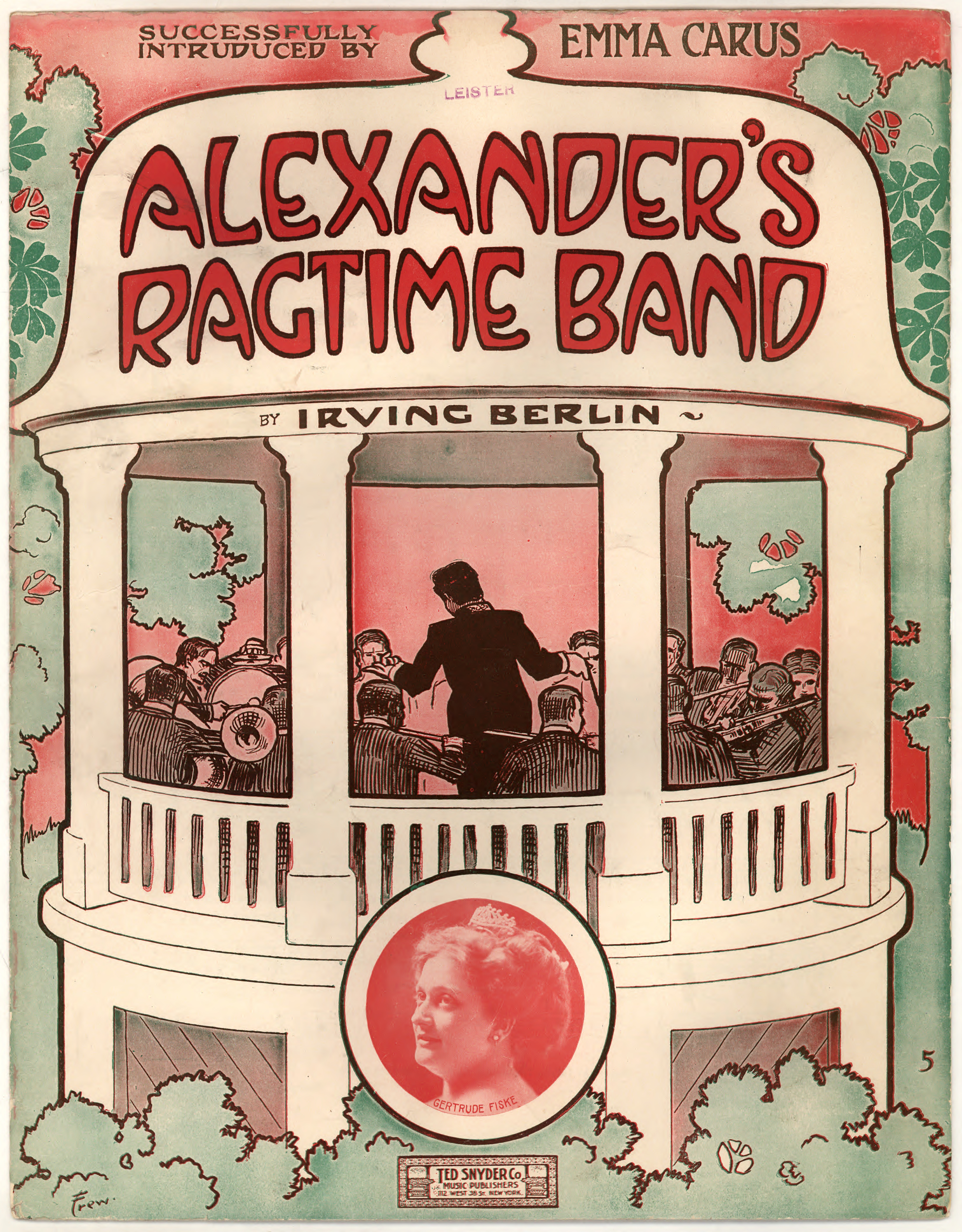
Page 1

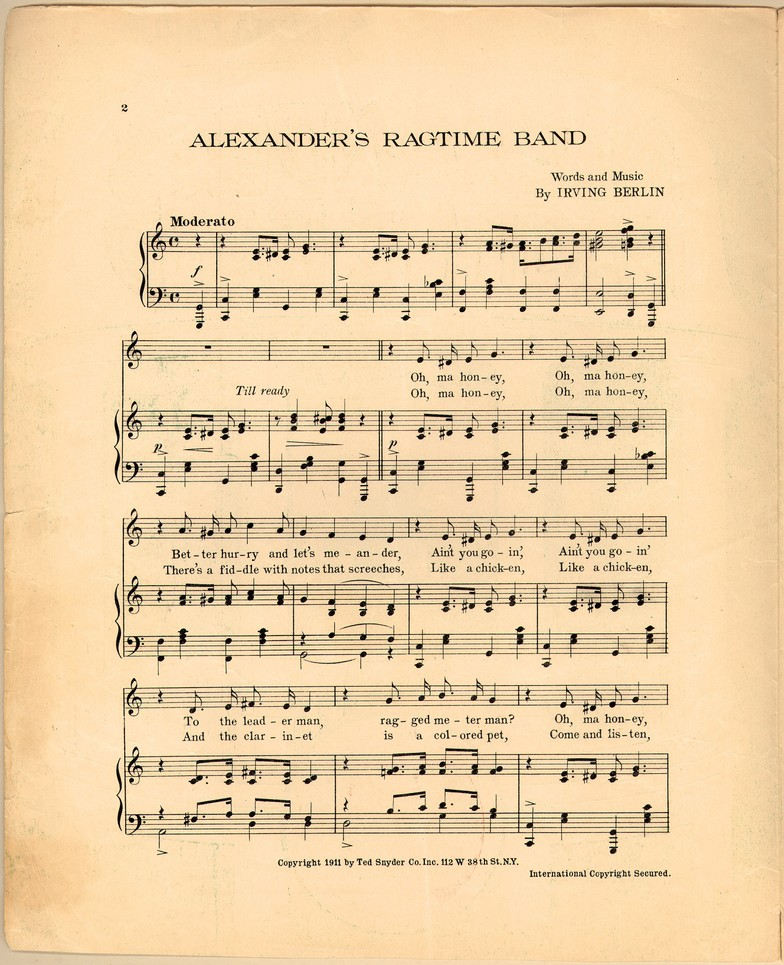
Page 2

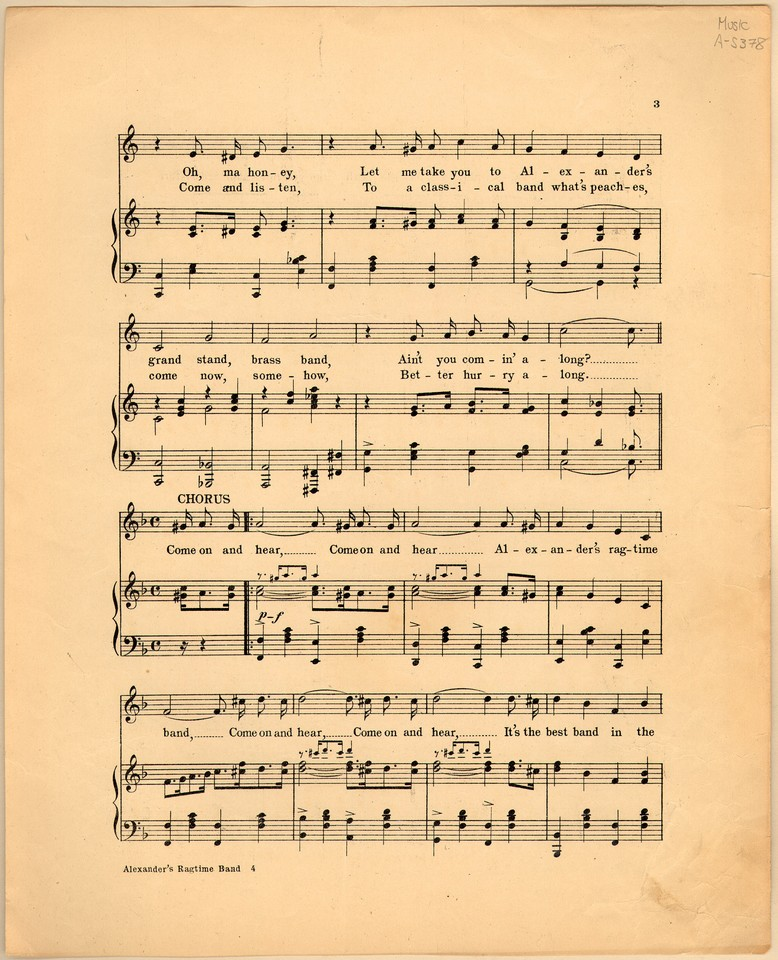
Page 3

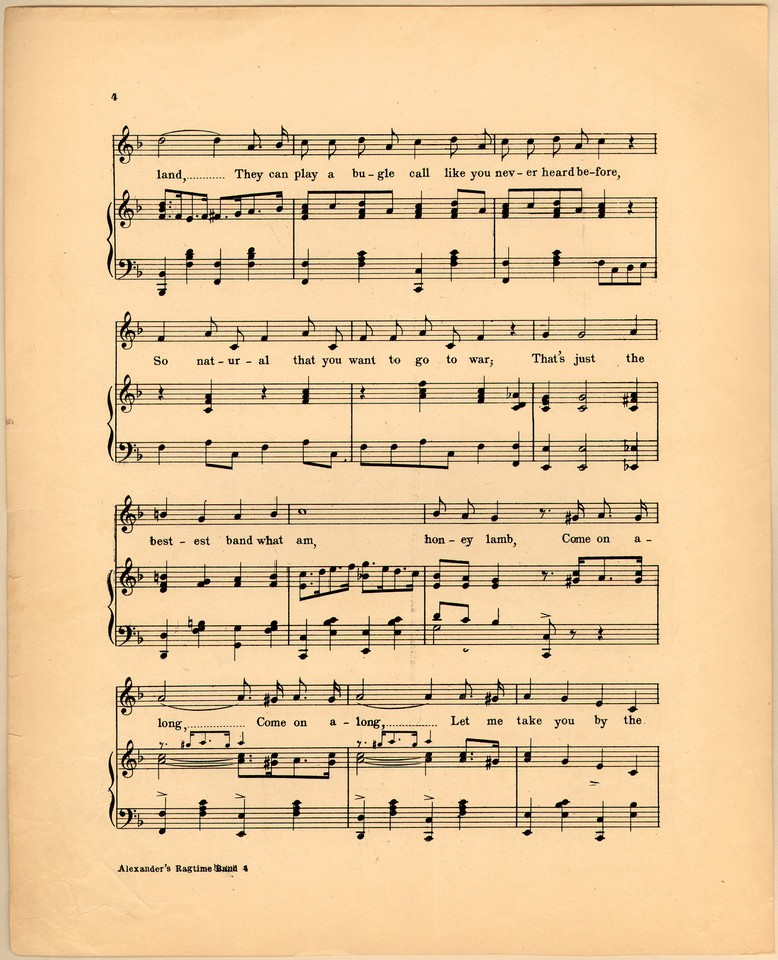
Page 4

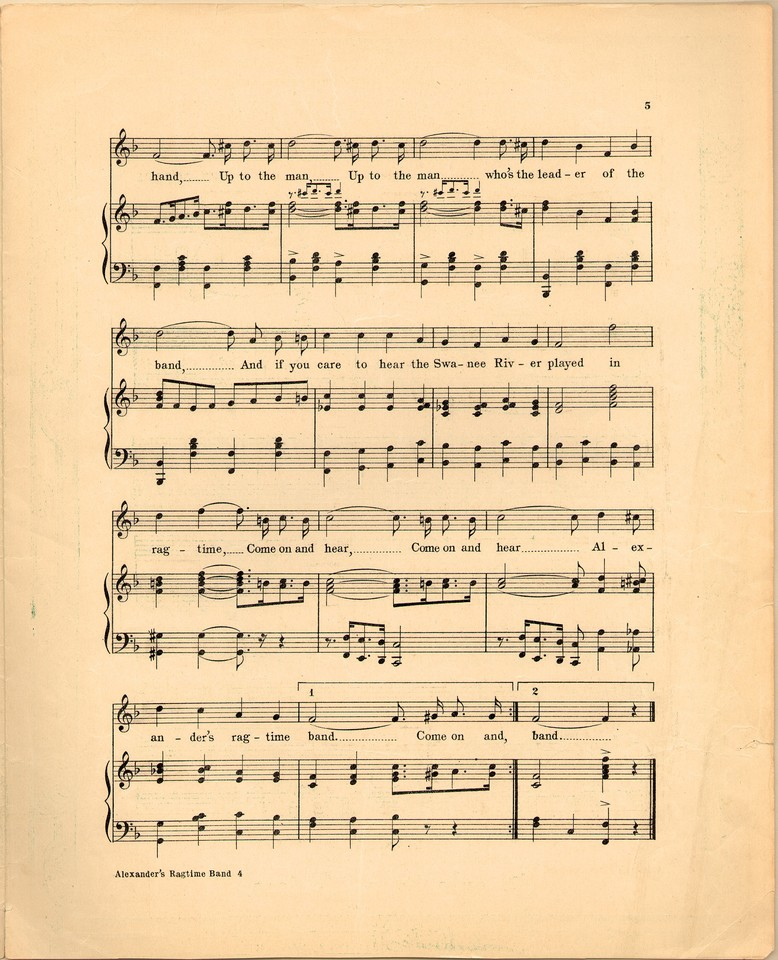
Page 5

== Notable recordings ==
Release	Performer	Vocalist	Recording date	Album	Label	Source
1911	Collins & Harlan	Arthur Collins & Byron G. Harlan	May 23, 1911	The Oceana Roll/Alexander’s Ragtime Band (Single)		
1927	Bessie Smith and Her Blue Boys	Bessie Smith	March 2, 1927	(Single)	Columbia Records	
1935	The Boswell Sisters	The Boswell Sisters	1935	(Single)		
1936	Benny Goodman & His Orchestra	instrumental	October 7, 1936	(Single)		
1937	Louis Armstrong & His Orchestra	Louis Armstrong	1937	(Single)		
1938	Bing Crosby & Connie Boswell with Victor Young & His Orchestra	Bing Crosby & Connie Boswell	January 26, 1938	(Single)		
1948	The Andrews Sisters with Vic Schoen & His Orchestra	The Andrews Sisters	May 1948	Irving Berlin Songs	Decca	
1958	Ella Fitzgerald	Ella Fitzgerald	March 19, 1958	Ella Fitzgerald Sings the Irving Berlin Song Book	Verve	
1959	Ray Charles	Ray Charles	June 23, 1959	The Genius of Ray Charles	Atlantic	
1962	King Curtis	instrumental	February 15, 1962	Doing the Dixie Twist	Tru-Sound	
1967	Julie London	Julie London	1967	With Body & Soul	Liberty	
1973	Smacka Fitzgibbon	Smacka Fitzgibbon	August 1973	Smacka's Party Album		

== See also ==
- List of pre-1920 jazz standards
- When Alexander Takes His Ragtime Band to France
- List of best-selling sheet music
