= Charles McCarron =

American composer and lyricist

Charles Russell McCarron (1891 – January 27, 1919) was a United States Tin Pan Alley and vaudeville composer and lyricist.

He was born in Janesville, Wisconsin. His father John H. McCarron was a veteran vaudeville actor and manager. He moved to New York in 1912.

Some of his best known songs include I Am Glad I Can Make You Cry and When the Sun Goes Down in Dixie. McCarron also wrote WWI songs, including "Your Lips Are No Man's Land But Mine", "Our Country's in It Now! (We've Got to Win It Now)", and "The Russians Were Rushin', The Yanks Started Yankin'. He collaborated with other composers including Albert Von Tilzer, Carey Morgan, and Chris Smith.

He composed for many vaudeville acts, including Bessie Clayton, Corinne Tilton, Harry Cooper, Mabel McCain, Nevins and Gordon, and Jimmie and Minnie Allen. His biggest productions were for Lucille Cavanagh's "kaleidoscope of dance, color and song" vaudeville program that toured for several years (Dave Stamper would provide the music for later versions), for Evelyn Nesbit's return to vaudeville "A Roseland Fantasy" in 1917.

He died of pneumonia at his home in New York on January 27, 1919 at age 27. He is interred at Woodlawn Cemetery.

== Selected works ==
- Blues My Naughty Sweetie Gives to Me (1919 song with Carey Morgan and Arthur N. Swanstone [aka "Arthur Swanstrom"])
- Down in Honky Tonky Town (1916 w. Charles McCarron m. Chris Smith)
- Dry Your Tears (part of Cavanagh's "kaleidoscope" vaudeville program in 1917)
- Eve Wasn't Modest 'Till She Ate That Apple
- Fido Is A Hot Dog Now
- Five Flights of Musical Comedy, vaudeville act for Betty Bond performed on the Orpheum circuit.
- A Holland Halloween, vaudeville act for Nevins and Gordon
- I Am Glad I Can Make You Cry
- Keep Cool, The Country's Saving Fuel
- Mamie's Little Pickaniny
- My Daddy In A Uniform
- "Oh Helen!" (a comedy stuttering song), composed with Carey Morgan
- Our Country's in It Now! (We've Got to Win It Now), 1918 song
- Out of the City of Six Million People, Why Do You Pick On Me? (with Nat Vincent)
- The Proposal, part of Cavanagh's vaudeville kaleidoscope program in 1917.
- The Russians Were Rushin', The Yanks Started Yankin' with lyrics by with Carey Morgan
- Songalogue, a vaudeville revue for Harry Cooper, 1919
- Sweeties, a vaudeville revue for Mabel McCain, 1919
- Wait And See (You'll Want Me Back), with Carey Morgan.
- When the Lusitania Went Down (1915 with Nathaniel Vincent)
- When the Sun Goes Down in Dixie
- When Old Bill Bailey Plays the Ukulele (1915 with Nathaniel Vincent)
- Yacki, Hacki, Wacki, Woo
- Your Lips Are No Man's Land But Mind
