= The Russians Were Rushin', the Yanks Started Yankin' =

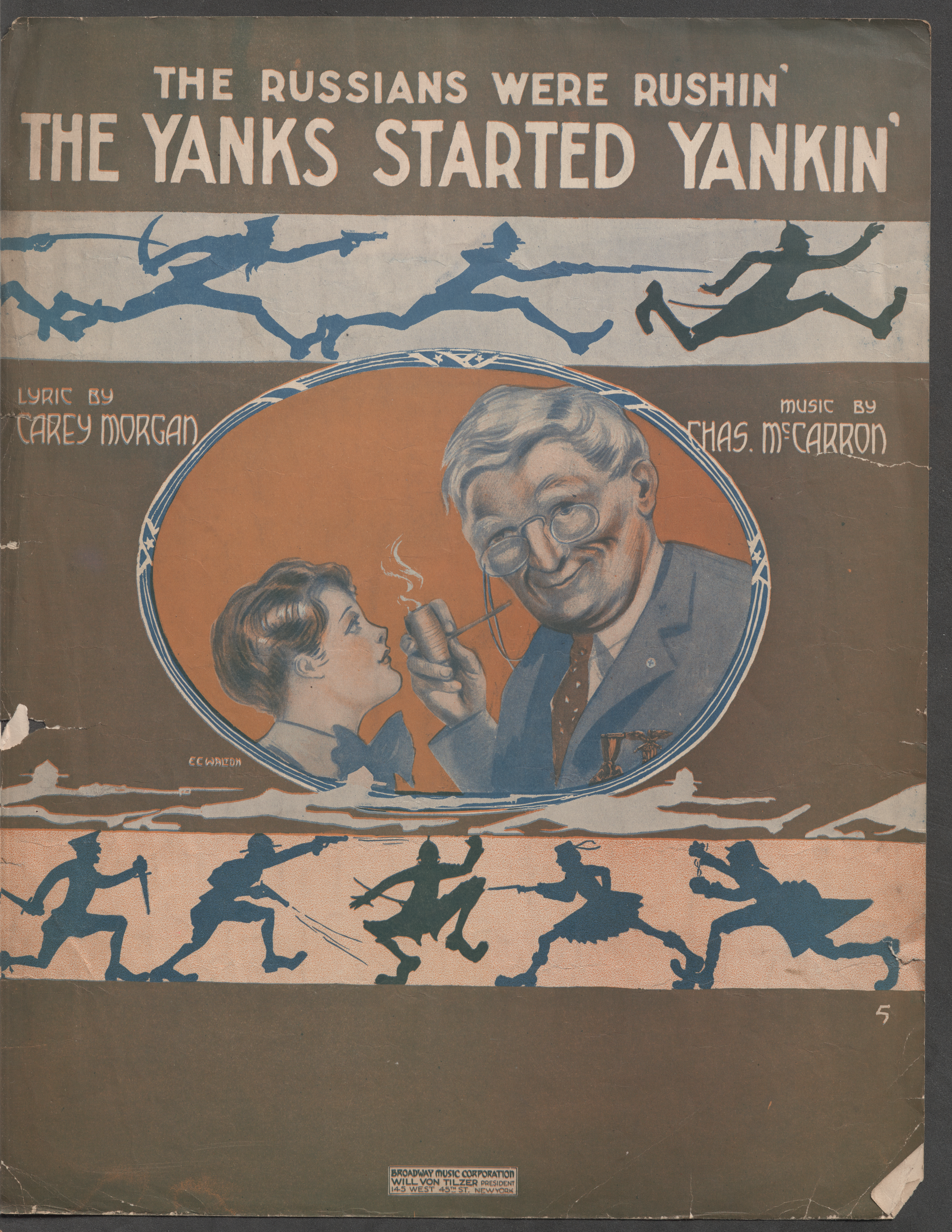
- Sheet music cover

Song
- Language: English
- Published: 1918
- Composer: Charles R. McCarron
- Lyricist: Carey Morgan

"The Russians Were Rushin', the Yanks Started Yankin'" is a World War I song written by Carey Morgan and composed by Charles R. McCarron. The song was first published in 1918 by Broadway Music Corporation in New York City. The sheet music cover depicts an elderly man smoking a pipe with silhouetted soldiers across the top and bottom.

This song was reprinted at least twice and was recorded by Arthur Fields.

The sheet music can be found at the Pritzker Military Museum & Library, and online through the Digital Collection of the University of Illinois at Urbana–Champaign University Library.

== Lyrics ==
The song is about a dream, set in the then-future year of 1953, where a veteran of World War I reflects on the year 1917 when various military troops defeated Wilhelm II of Germany. It turns out this was the dream of a school boy, day dreaming in class, who learns that Germany no longer exists because it was wiped out during World War I (a conflict which still had to end at the time this song was recorded).

Lyrics
I dreamed of a scene in an old soldier's home,
The year was nineteen fifty three.
With medals galore that he'd won in this war,
He sat smoking peacefully.
Tell me of the war of nineteen seventeen,
Said his grandson who stood by his side.
How did they fix up that terrible mix up?
And proudly the old man replied:

My dream quickly changed to a schoolroom that day,
The lesson was geography.
A child raised her hand, said, "I don't understand,
This map looks all wrong to me.
What is this strange place that is marked Germany?"
And the teacher replied with a roar.
"Why, that's an old map, dear since we had that scrap, dear,
There ain't no such place anymore.

The Russians were rushin' the Prussians,
The Prussians were crushin' the Russians.
The Balkins were balkin' and Turkey was squawkin'
Rasputin disputtin' and Italy scootin'
The Boches all bulled bolshevikis
The British were skittish at sea.
But the good Lord I'm thankin'
The Yanks started yankin',
And yanked Kaiser Bill up a tree.

The Russians were rushin' the Prussians,
The Prussians were crushin' the Russians.
The good old Italians were hurling battalions
Canadians raidin' and Frenchmen invadin'
The Bulgars were bulgin' the Belgians
But Yanks started yankin' you see.
And when Peace was conceded,
Some new maps were needed,
They ruined the geography.
