= Nora Bayes =

American singer and vaudeville performer (1880–1928)

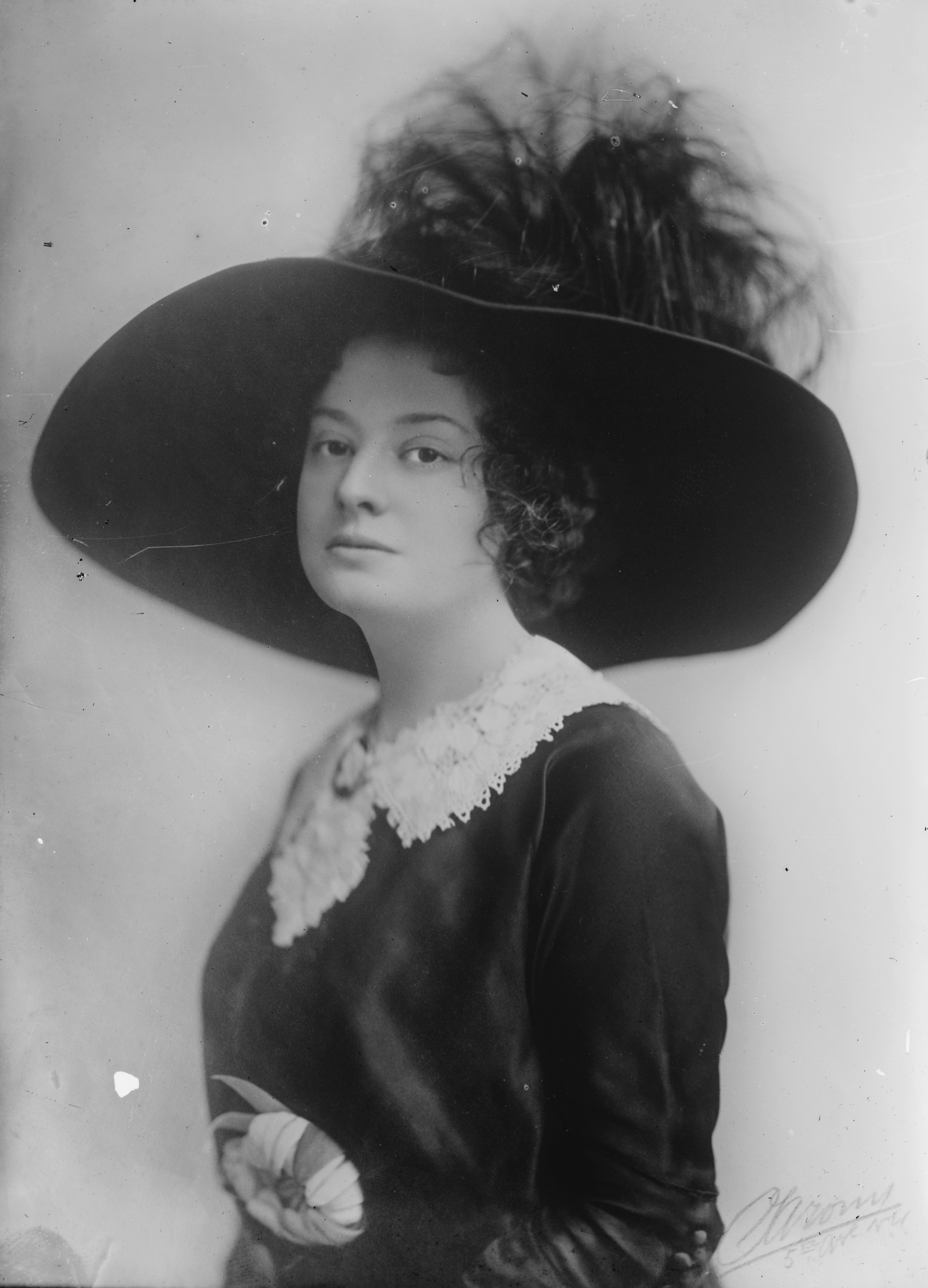

Background information
- Also known as: Dora Goldberg; Nora Bayes Friedland
- Born: Rachel Eleonora Goldberg; October 3, 1880; Chicago, Illinois, U.S.
- Died: March 19, 1928 (aged 47) Brooklyn, New York, U.S.
- Genre: Vaudeville
- Occupations: Comedian, singer, entertainer
- Years active: 1900–1927
- Labels: Victor, Columbia
- Spouses: Otto Gressing (m. 1899–1907) Jack Norworth (m. 1908–1913) Harry Clarke (m. 1913–1915) Arthur Gordoni (m. 1920–1922) Ben Friedland (m. 1925)

Nora Bayes (born Rachel Eleonora "Dora" Goldberg; October 3, 1880 – March 19, 1928) was an American singer and vaudeville performer who was popular internationally between the 1900s and 1920s. She is credited with co-writing the song "Shine On, Harvest Moon" and performed many successful songs during the First World War, including "Over There". She was also noted for her independent views and unconventional private life, becoming an early media celebrity. She made over 160 recordings.

== Life and career ==
=== Early life ===
She was born in 1880 in Chicago, the daughter of Rachel and David Goldberg, a Polish-born saloon keeper. She seems to have been given the traditional family name Rachel at birth but was known as Eleonora, or "Dora" as a nickname. She grew up in a strict Orthodox Jewish household and moved with her parents to Milwaukee, Wisconsin, in her teens. In 1899, she married salesman Otto Gressing.

They lived in Joliet, Illinois, and in the hope of starting a stage career, she began performing at talent shows in nearby Chicago. She adopted the stage name Nora Bayes: "Nora" as a shortened form of Eleonora and "Bayes" because, according to one story, a local stage manager said that she would not have a good career with the name Goldberg. He suggested going through the Hebrew alphabet to find a name and recited "Aleph, bays ..." when she stopped him and suggested Bayes.

=== Early career ===
The Japanese Sandman
The Japanese Sandman, performed by Nora Bayes and the Charles A. Prince Orchestra in 1920

By late 1900, Helen Cohan, the mother of George M. Cohan, saw Bayes performing vaudeville in Chicago. Bayes joined a touring company, performing in St Louis, Missouri, and then California, before she decided to advance her career further and moved with her husband to New York City. She grew in popularity as a comic actress and singer, and in 1902 started performing Harry Von Tilzer's song, "Down Where the Wurzburger Flows", which she performed at the Orpheum Theatre in Brooklyn and which became her first big success.

Over the next few years, Bayes performed in increasingly prestigious theatres in New York, toured the country, and between 1904 and 1907 made several tours of Europe. She first performed in London in December 1905, and was an immediate success. After returning to the United States, she performed regularly on B. F. Keith's theatre circuit. She and Gressing divorced in 1907, and soon afterwards she was approached by impresario Florenz Ziegfeld to star in a new theatre show, The Follies of 1907.

The show, soon retitled The Ziegfeld Follies, was a huge success and established Bayes's status, making her one of the highest paid female performers in the world. Ziegfeld contributed to her fame by telling the press falsely that Bayes lived on nothing but lollypops to keep her figure trim.

In 1908, Bayes married fellow performer Jack Norworth, and the couple became media celebrities. They performed together, and were credited with co-writing several songs in the Ziegfeld Follies of 1908, including the hit song "Shine On, Harvest Moon". Bayes was the star performer, commanding a much higher salary than Norworth, and sometimes challenging the authority of theatre managers and promoters. She walked out of the Ziegfeld Follies of 1909 because of a disagreement with Ziegfeld over the billing of a rising new star named Sophie Tucker; Ziegfeld then sued Bayes for breach of contract, which prevented her performing in other theatres for several months.

She and Norworth returned to the vaudeville circuit, in the show Miss Innocence, and commanded an even higher salary than before. "Critics noted that Bayes succeeded through her lush singing voice, her sensitivity to her audience’s tastes and her willingness to make fun of herself, including jokes about her Jewish background and her failed marriages." In 1910, they appeared together in Lew Fields's show, The Jolly Bachelors.

In 1910, Bayes made her first recordings for the Victor Talking Machine Company, and had immediate success with "Has Anybody Here Seen Kelly", an Americanised version of a British song. Another show in 1911 was "Little Miss Fix-It". She and Norworth recorded and continued to perform together until their final show, The Sun Dodgers, in 1912. By this time, their personal and professional relationships were both troubled, and they divorced in 1913. In 1913 she wore a green wig as a stunt, which led to a local popularity of colored wigs. One month later, Bayes married Harry Clarke, an actor and dancer; they divorced in 1915. She starred in the 1915 Broadway revue Maid in America.

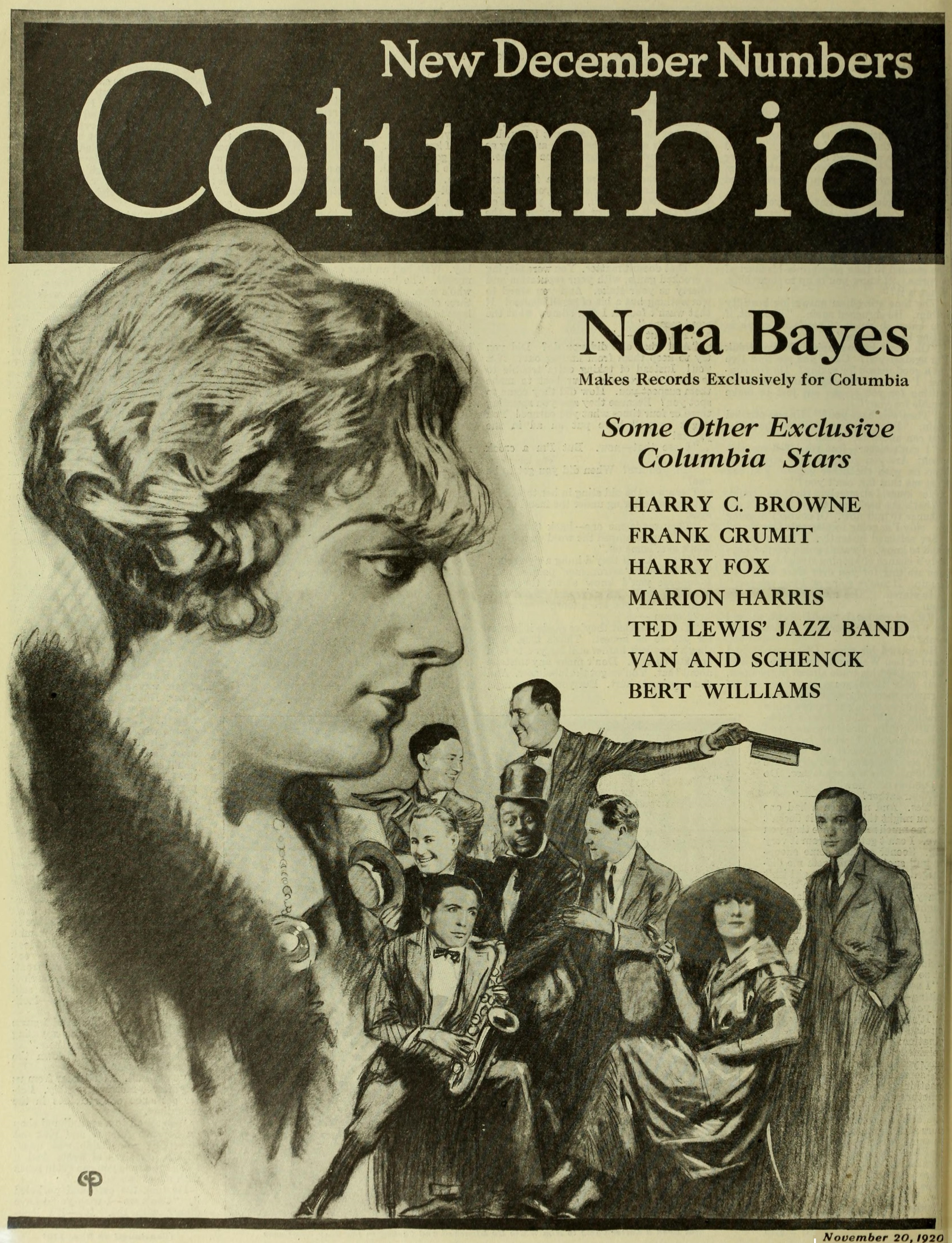
Nora Bayes with Columbia

Bayes continued to find success on the Keith vaudeville circuit, billed as "The World's Greatest Singing Single Comedienne", before reuniting briefly with Norworth in the Broadway revue Odds and Ends of 1917. She then launched her own one-woman show, and starred in the musical Ladies First in 1918, in which she appeared with young piano accompanist George Gershwin. She also returned to recording, and had one of her greatest successes with the patriotic First World War song, "Over There", written by George M. Cohan. She signed a new contract with Columbia Records, and recorded over sixty songs for the label over the next six years. Her most successful recordings for Columbia included "How Ya Gonna Keep 'em Down on the Farm (After They've Seen Paree)?" (1919) and "Make Believe" (1921). In 1920 she had a hit with "Broadway Blues" with words by Arthur Swanstrom and music by Carey Morgan.

=== Later career ===
She married for a fourth time in 1920, to actor and entertainer Arthur Gordon (sometimes billed as Gordoni). They adopted three children together, but divorced in 1922 after two years together. By this time, Bayes's success was diminishing; she made no recordings after the end of her Columbia contract in 1923, bookings decreased, and she was performing in smaller venues. She refused to take part in the expanding film industry, claiming that she would make too much money and that "the mental anguish I would suffer would make me unfit to enjoy life. No, siree. No movie work for me!"

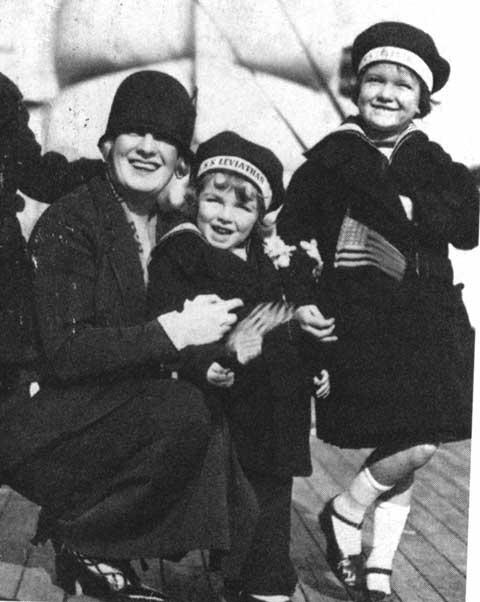
Nora Bayes (left) with Peter Oxley Bayes (middle), and Lea Nora Bayes (right), aboard the S.S. Leviathan, 1924

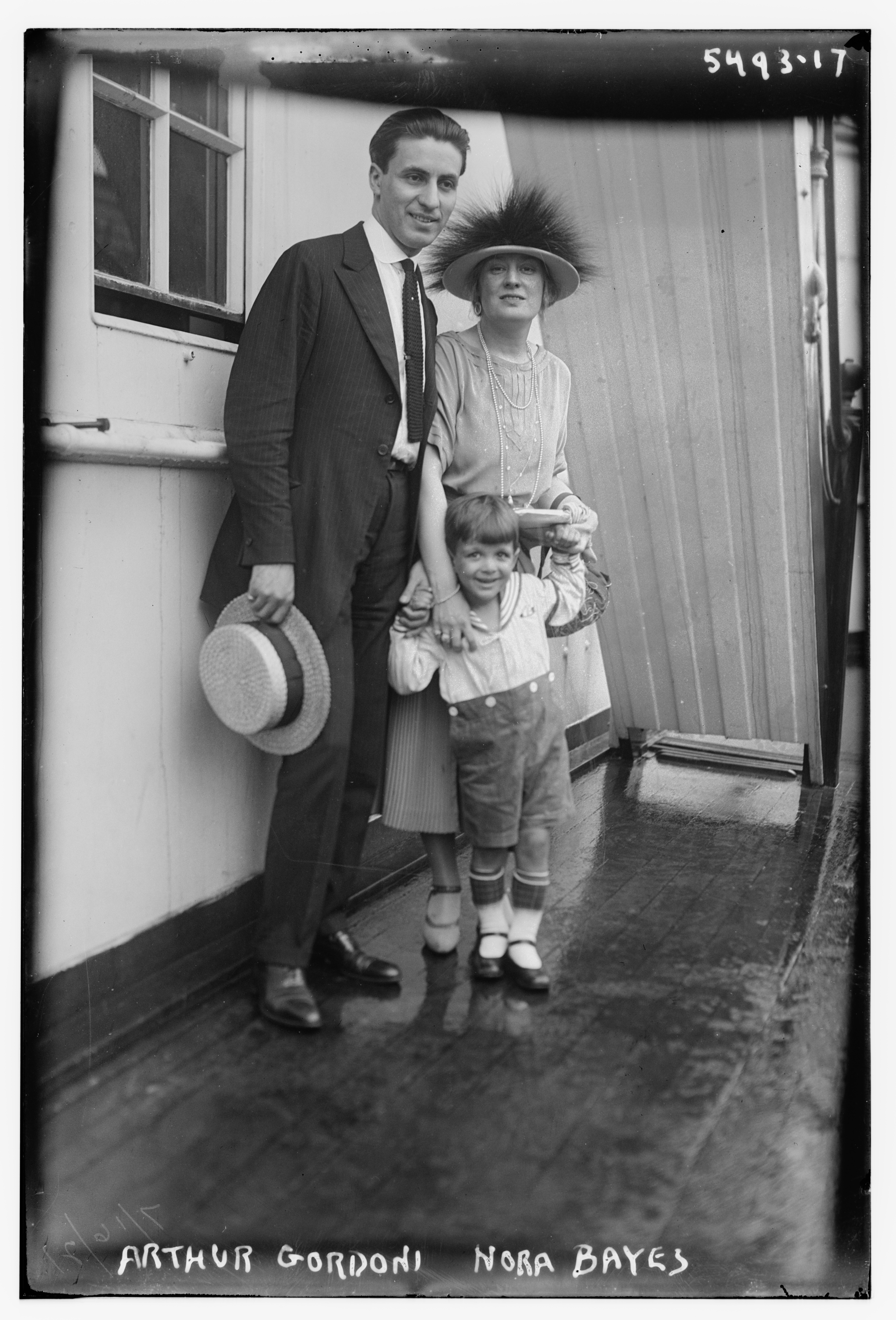
Nora Bayes, Arthur Gordon, and their adopted son Norman Bayes Gordoni sometime in the early 1920s

She made several trips to Europe in the early 1920s, travelling with her adopted children. Bayes was described as "easily the most popular female entertainer in vaudeville for much of the first quarter of the 20th century". One researcher commented:

Bayes refused to obey the social mores that ruled expectations of how women should behave. Her personal life caught the attention of the press: she provided endless headlines for her broken theatre contracts and her five divorces. Her marriages were reported across the globe. On news of her fifth marriage, one Australian newspaper reported her advice to wives: “as soon as one becomes bored, one should secure divorce.” The press hardly knew which was more shocking, her divorces or the fact she had walked out of her contract with Florenz Ziegfeld.

== Death and legacy ==
Bayes married again in 1925 to New York businessman Benjamin Lester Friedland, owner of the Affiliated Garages chain of automobile repair shops, the ceremony taking place on board a ship. She continued to perform until 1927. However, by that time she was becoming ill and visibly weakened by stomach cancer, which she had been suffering from for several years. She died at the Jewish Hospital of Brooklyn in 1928, aged 47. She left an estate of $43,500 for her family.

Friedland refused to allow her remains to be buried before his own death, so her coffin remained in a receiving vault for eighteen years. Friedland died in 1946 and she was buried alongside him in Woodlawn Cemetery, New York. A headstone was not put in place until 2018, when Michael Cumella, a fan of Bayes, made arrangements for one to be added to her grave.

The 1944 movie Shine On, Harvest Moon, starring Ann Sheridan as Bayes, is a highly fictionalized account of her life with Jack Norworth, who was still alive at the time but was not involved in the project.

== Partial Discography ==
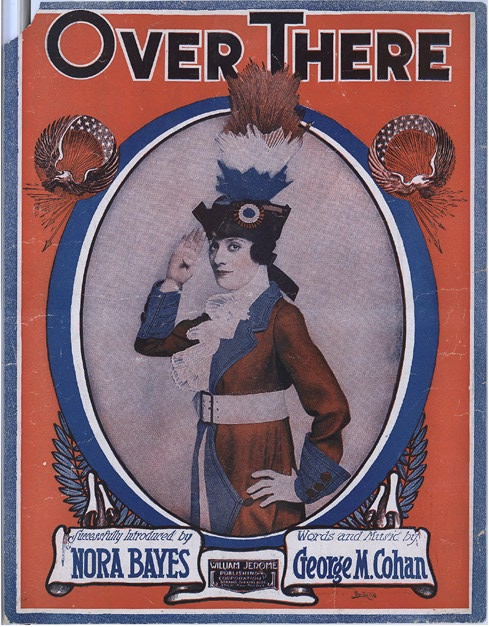
Nora Bayes on the cover of Over There

Victor:

Has Anybody Seen Kelly? (1910) That Lovin' Rag (1910) You Can't Get Away From It (1914) Over There (1917)

Columbia:

The Man Who Put The Germ in Germany (1918) Prohibition Blues (1920) The Japanese Sandman (1921) To-Morrow (1923) Runnin' Wild (1923)
