= Our Country's in It Now! (We've Got to Win It Now) =

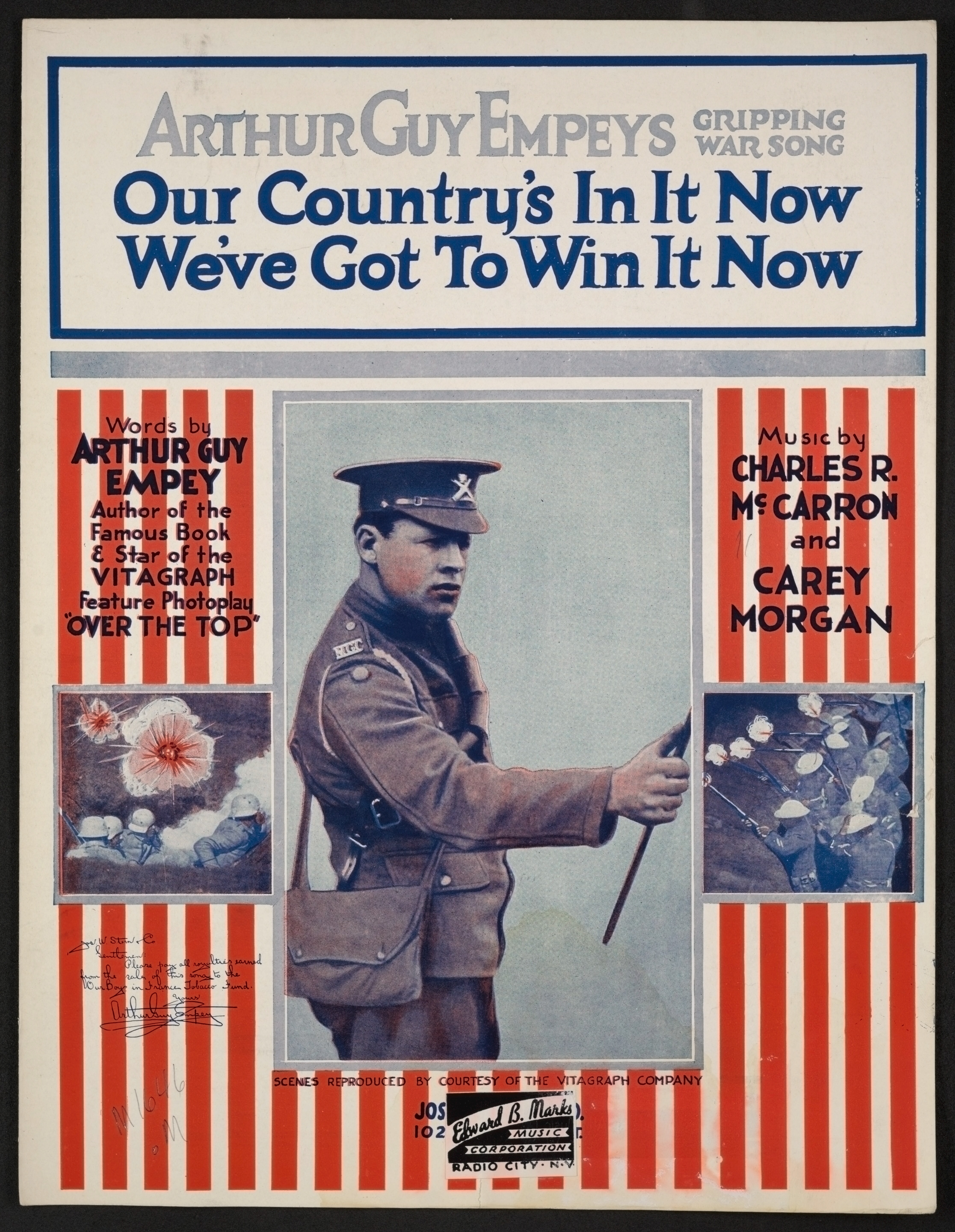
- Sheet music cover of "Our Country's in It Now! (We've Got to Win It Now)"

Song
- Released: 1918
- Label: Jos. W. Stern & Co.
- Composer(s): Charles R. McCarron and Carey Morgan
- Lyricist(s): Arthur Guy Empey

Our Country's in It Now! (We've Got to Win It Now) is a World War I era song released in 1918. Arthur Guy Empey wrote the lyrics. Charles R. McCarron and Carey Morgan composed the music. The song was published by Jos. W. Stern & Co. of New York, New York. On the cover, on both the left and right side, are drawings of soldiers engaged in trench warfare. In the center is a photograph of Arthur Guy Empey dressed in uniform. It is written for voice and piano.

The lyrics state that Germany began the war, and Italy and England joined with France to help Belgium. It is ultimately up to the United States to win it. Throughout the song there are lines that can be classified as a call to action. For example:

- "Ev'ry mother's son should run get a gun. We've got to punish the Hun"
- "We can help by buying bonds"
- "Food we must conserve. Wheatless buns help give the Huns the licking they deserve"

The sheet music can be found at the Library of Congress and Pritzker Military Museum & Library.
