= Your Lips Are No Man's Land But Mine =

- "Your Lips Are No Man's Land But Mine" cover art

Song
- Published: 1918
- Label: Joseph W Stern & Co
- Songwriter(s): Lyricist: Arthur Guy Empey; Composer: Charles R. McCarron, Carey Morgan

"Your Lips Are No Man's Land But Mine" is a World War I war song. It became a hit in 1918 when released by Henry Burr & Albert Campbell, charting peaking at #2 in the United States.

The song presents a group of soldiers leaving for battle as their girlfriends and wives watch and cry. The soldiers assure the girls that they will return, and the soldiers declare they will not be sad because they know their girls will stay faithful while they are gone. The chorus reads:

"I'm coming back some day when the fray is over my darling
I know you'll be true, dear
So I'll never be blue, dear,
Across the goam in No Man's land I'll soon be fighting
But I know your lips are no man's land but mine."

== Composition ==
The song was composed by Charles R. McCarron and Carey Morgan, with words by Arthur Guy Empey. It was published by Joseph W Stern & Co in New York City in 1918.

Cover art for the composition shows that the sheet music was priced at US$0.60. The sheet music features a plug to Empey's book and film "Over the Top."

A score variant have an as sung by inset with Carl S. Graves.
