= I'm Glad I Can Make You Cry =

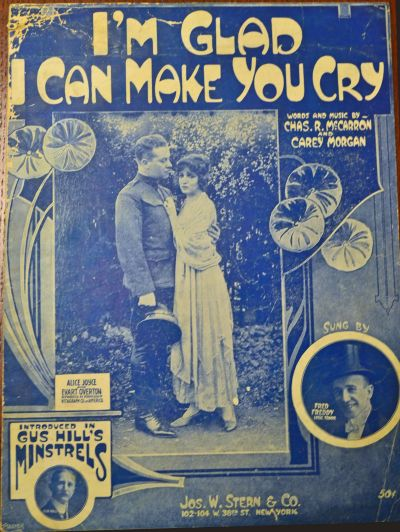
- Sheet Music cover

Song
- Language: English
- Published: 1918
- Songwriter(s): Chas. R. McCarron & Carey Morgan

I'm Glad I Can Make You Cry is a World War I song written and composed by Charles R. McCarron and Carey Morgan. The song was published in 1918 by Jos. W. Stern & Co. in New York, NY. The sheet music cover, illustrated by Starmer, depicts photos of Alice Joyce & Evart Overton, as well as Bessie Hamilton and Gus Hall's Minstrels.

The sheet music can be found at the Pritzker Military Museum & Library.
