= Sea legs =

Sea legs may refer to:

- Illusions of self-motion, felt on dry land after spending time at sea
- Sea Legs, a 1937 Broadway musical
- Sea Legs (film), starring Jack Oakie and Lillian Roth
- "Sea Legs" (song), by The Shins on their 2007 album Wincing the Night Away
- "Sea Legs", a song by Frank Turner from the 2007 EP The Real Damage
- "Sea Legs", a song by Run the Jewels from the 2013 album Run the Jewels
- "Sea Legs", a song by Spirit Caravan from the 1999 album Jug Fulla Sun
- Sea Legs, an EP by Samantha Shelton
- Sealegs Amphibious Craft, a brand of amphibious vehicle
- Sea Legs, a brand name of antihistamine drug Meclizine
