= Arthur Swanstrom =

American lyricist, playwright (1888–1940)

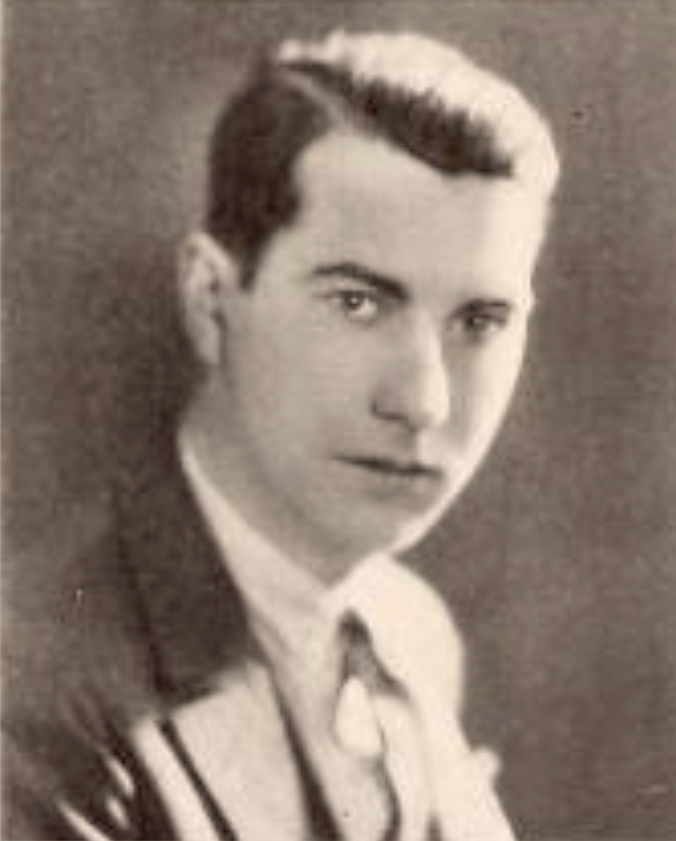
Arthur Swanstrom (1923)

Arthur M. Swanstrom (August 4, 1888 – October 4, 1940) was an American lyricist, playwright, producer, and dancer. The son of politician J. Edward Swanstrom, he began his career as a ballroom dancer, primarily performing in that capacity in nightclubs and in vaudeville. He expanded into working as a lyricist, initially working in partnership with John Murray Anderson as the lyricist for the revue The Greenwich Village Follies from 1919 to 1921. He became active as a Tin Pan Alley songwriter, writing lyrics for popular songs. Some of his hit songs included "Blues My Naughty Sweetie Gives to Me" (1919), "The Argentines, The Portuguese, and the Greeks" (1920), "Broadway Blues" (1920), "Rain" (1927), and "Twenty-Four Hours A Day" (1935). Many of his songs were written in collaboration with Carey Morgan, although he worked with several other composers during his career. He was both producer and lyricist for the Broadway productions of Sons O' Guns (1929) and Princess Charming (1930), and authored both the lyrics and book to the Broadway musical Sea Legs (1937). Ill health and financial problems plagued Swanstrom in the last years of his life, and he died of a stroke in 1940 at the age of 52.

== Early life and career ==
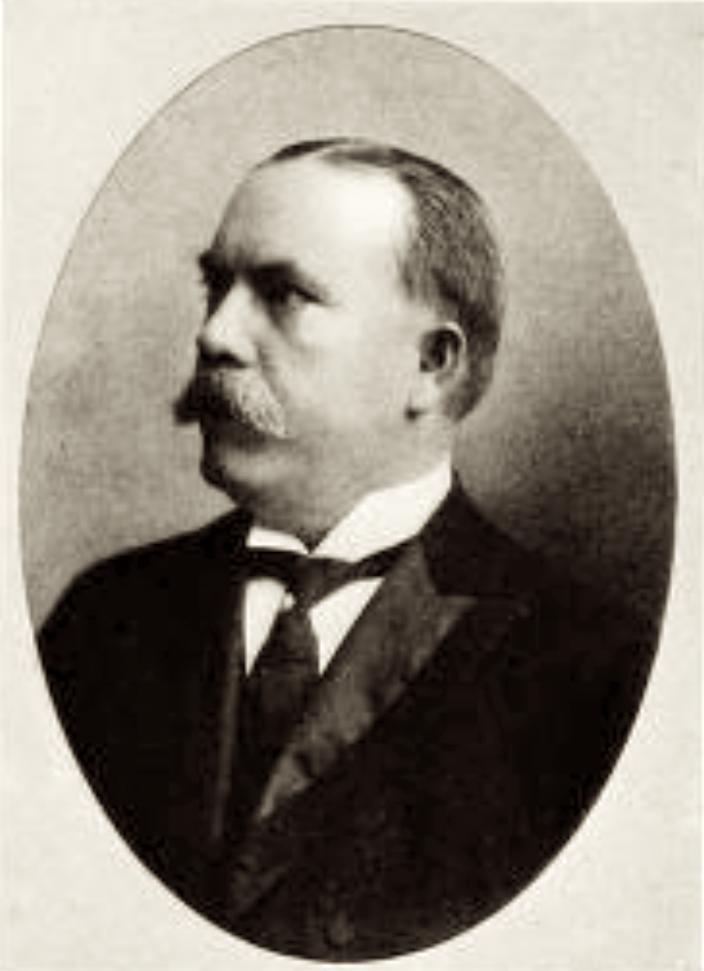
J. Edward Swanstrom

The son of J. Edward Swanstrom and Francis N. Swanstrom (née Harris), Arthur Swanstrom was born in Brooklyn, New York, on August 4, 1888. His father was a well known lawyer and local politician who served a term as Borough president of Brooklynn. His grandparents on his father's side had immigrated to the United States from Sweden, and his grandfather, John P. Swanstrom, was a well known clergyman in New York. Arthur was attending Public School 3 in Bedford–Stuyvesant, Brooklyn at the time that his father was serving on the school board of the New York City Public Schools as Brooklyn's elected representative in 1898.

Swanstrom composed the music and wrote the libretto to a three act opera entitled The Island Empire which was given its premiere in an amateur production at a summer resort in Westminster Park on Wellesley Island in 1907. He also starred in this production in the lead male role. This was followed by a musical comedy written by Swanstrom which was presented at the Westminster Hotel on Wellesley Island in 1908. From Wellesley Island, the Swanstrom family sponsored a regatta held on the St. Lawrence River, the winner of which was awarded the Swanstrom Cup. Arthur was the family member who represented the family in the 1912 regatta, awarding the cup to the boat race's winner. His father had died from pneumonia the year previously with Arthur and his mother and sister at his father's bedside at the time of his death.

Arthur began his professional career as a ballroom dancer, and worked in that capacity in nightclubs and in vaudeville in the 1910s. On June 30, 1914, his mother was struck by a train and killed in Bronxville, New York. Newspaper reports on the incident stated that Arthur was then employed as an actor in New York.

== Lyricist, playwright, and producer ==
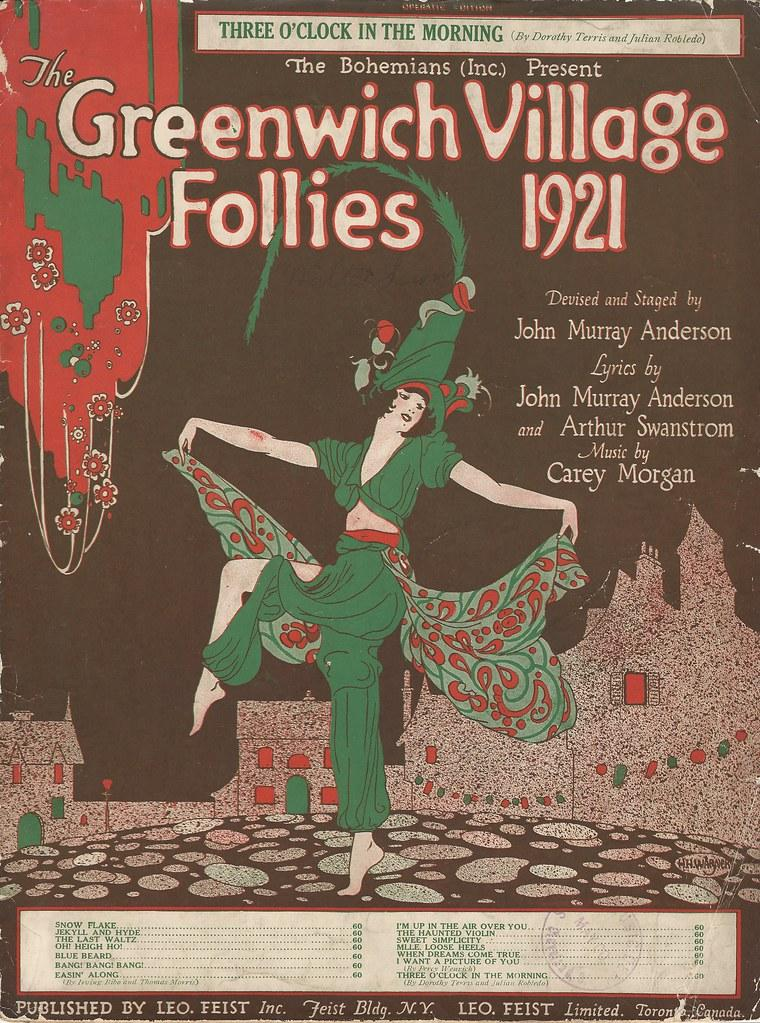
Music published by Leo Feist. Artwork by H.H. Warner

Swanstrom's first significant work as a lyricist was done in partnership with John Murray Anderson. Together they co-wrote the lyrics to the musical revue The Greenwich Village Follies of 1919. Called by theatre scholar Thomas S. Hischak "the first Off-Broadway musical to gain wide recognition in New York", the work premiered at the Greenwich Village Theatre on July 15, 1919. It successfully transferred to Broadway where it ran at the Nora Bayes Theatre in 1919–1920. Swanstrom went on to write more lyrics for The Greenwich Village Follies, penning words for the 1920 and 1921 iterations of that revue.

With composer Carey Morgan and songwriter Charles McCarron, Swanstrom co-wrote the hit song "Blues (My Naughty Sweetie Gives to Me)", a work which was first recorded in 1919 by Irving Kaufman but didn't become a hit until 1920 when Ted Lewis's later recording popularized the work. More than 50 years later the song was interpolated into the 1975 Broadway musical Doctor Jazz. Jimmie Noone's recording of the song was used on the soundtrack to Woody Allen's 2013 film Blue Jasmine, and a new recording by Cherise Adams-Burnett was used in the 2022 film Downton Abbey: A New Era.

Swanstrom contributed the song "Alibi Blues" (both music and lyrics) to the 1920 Broadway musical Silks and Satins. He collaborated with Carey Morgan again on the song "The Argentines, The Portuguese, and the Greeks" which was first recorded by Nora Bayes in 1920. This song was not only a hit for Bayes, but also for Eddie Cantor who also recorded the work in 1920. In 1940 Variety stated that this song contained the best lyrics of Swanstrom's career.

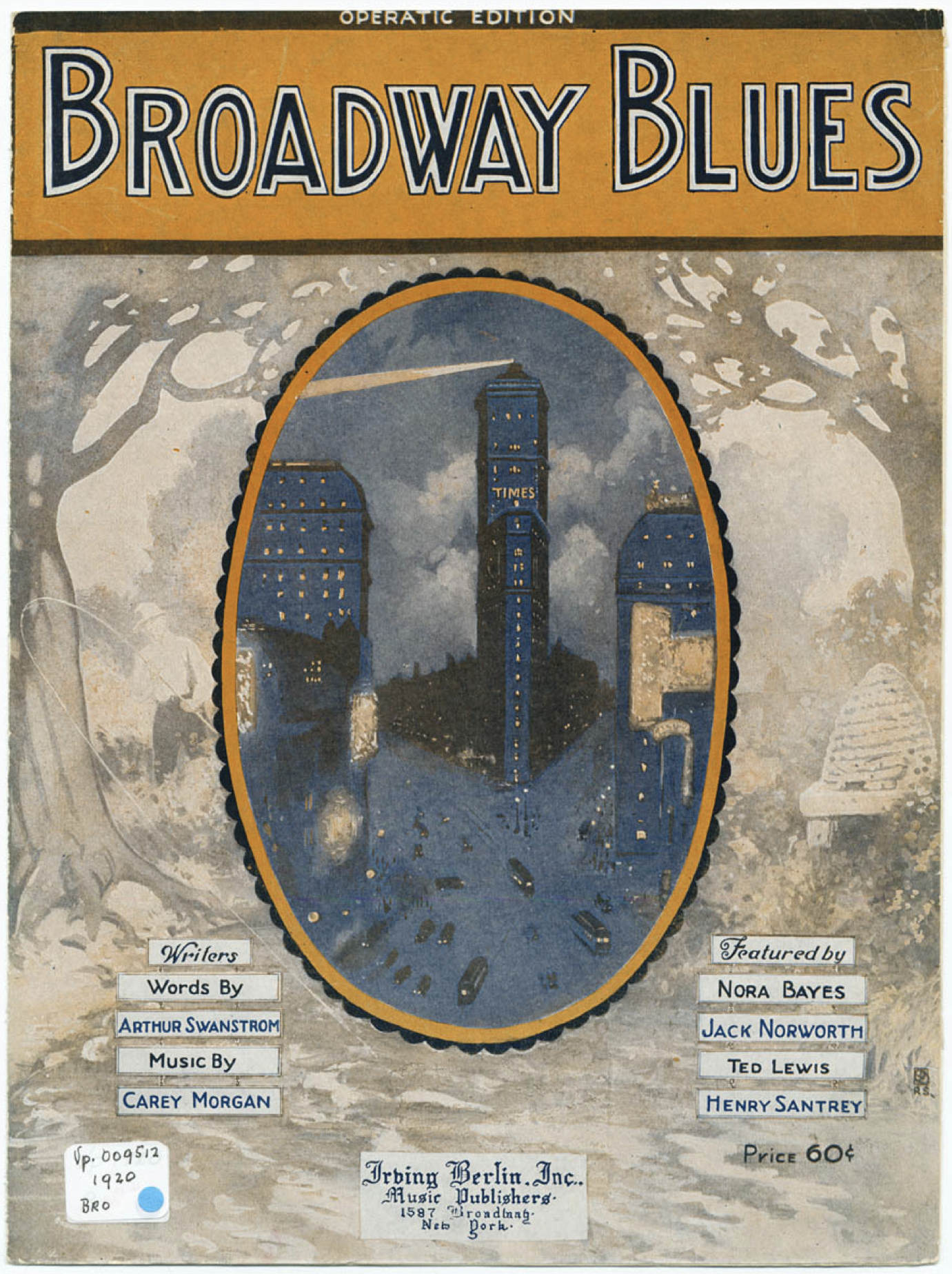
1920 sheet music cover for "Broadway Blues"

Morgan and Swanstrom also collaborated on another successful 1920 song, "Broadway Blues", which had two hit recordings in 1920, one by Nora Bayes and the other by the duo of Noble Sissle and Eubie Blake. Elsie Janis used the song "The Bonus Blues" by Swanstrom and Morgan in the 1922 Broadway musical Elsie and Her Gang. With Morgan he also created the musical Maiden Voyage. Paul Gerard Smith wrote the book to this musical with Morgan composing the music, and Swanstrom writing the lyrics. It premiered in 1926 but never made it to Broadway.

Morgan and Swanstrom also co-authored the 1927 popular song "Rain" with songwriter Eugene Ford. The song was introduced by Rudy Vallée and was one of Vallée's early hit songs. Early popular recordings of "Rain" were made by Donald Voorhees (Columbia Records), Sam Lanin and his orchestra (Banner Records), and Arnold Frank And His Roger's Cafe Orchestra (Okeh Records). In 1928 singer Marion Harris was filmed singing the song for one of the first short films using sound: Songs: "Rain" and "Down by the Old Front Gate" (made by Metro Movietone, a division of MGM). It was later sung by Ella Fitzgerald, and became a hit record in 1950 when it was recorded by the Frank Petty Trio.

At the time of Swanstrom's death, Variety magazine described the 1929 Broadway musical Sons O' Guns as the highlight of Swanstrom's career. Swanstrom not only wrote the lyrics to this show, but was also one of its producers. Warner Bros. Pictures made the musical into a film which was released in 1936. When Albert Szirmai's operetta Princess Charming was adapted for the Broadway stage, Swanstrom provided new lyrics for production which opened at the Imperial Theatre in October 1930. He also produced this production. Swanstrom also penned straight plays and wrote dramatic sketches and lyrics for vaudeville.

While normally not a composer, Swanstrom did contribute to both words and music to the 1933 Broadway musical Hold Your Horses in collaboration with several other authors. With Louis Alter he co-wrote the song "Come Up and See Me Sometime" for the 1933 Paramount Pictures movie musical Take a Chance in which singer and actress Lillian Roth introduced the tune. He collaborated with composer Karl Hajos to craft a musical about the life of American songwriter Stephen Foster, a work which incorporated music by Foster but with some new music by Hajos and lyrics by Swanstrom. It premiered in Boston on October 9, 1934, at the Shubert Theatre under the name America Sings, but a forthcoming Broadway run never materialized. He also wrote the lyrics to the 1934 Off-Broadway revue Casino Varieties which used music by John Frederick Coots and Louis Alter.

With James F. Hanley, Swanstrom co-wrote the song "Twenty-Four Hours A Day" (1935). It was briefly interpolated into the 1935 Broadway revue Earl Carroll's Sketchbook, but was cut from the show. The song was included in the 1935 Universal Pictures film Sweet Surrender where it was performed by Frank Parker. This song was also recorded by Billie Holiday in 1935, and is included in the Grammy Award winning box set Lady Day: The Complete Billie Holiday on Columbia 1933–1944 (2001, Sony Music). Other artists to record this song include jazz pianist Teddy Wilson, singer Chick Bullock, Jan Garber and his jazz band, and violinist Al Donahue and his band.

Alone, Swanstrom wrote both the lyrics and book to the Broadway musical Sea Legs (1937, composer Michael H. Cleary) which was staged at the Mansfield Theatre. His 1940 obituary in Variety stated that Swanstrom had recently written a non-musical stage play which had been accepted by a producer for a forthcoming New York production at the time of his death.

== Later life and death ==
Swanstrom suffered from both ill health and financial problems during the last years of his life. He died of a stroke on October 4, 1940, in Scarsdale, New York, at the age of 52. He died in the home of John Hoagland, son of Royal Baking Powder Company founder Joseph C. Hoagland, with whom he had been staying since he was unable to provide for himself.

Due to his poor financial state at the time of his death, the American Society of Composers, Authors and Publishers paid for both Swanstrom's funeral and his burial. Many of his songs were recorded. These are catalogued in the Discography of American Historical Recordings.
