= Troopers Three =

1930 film

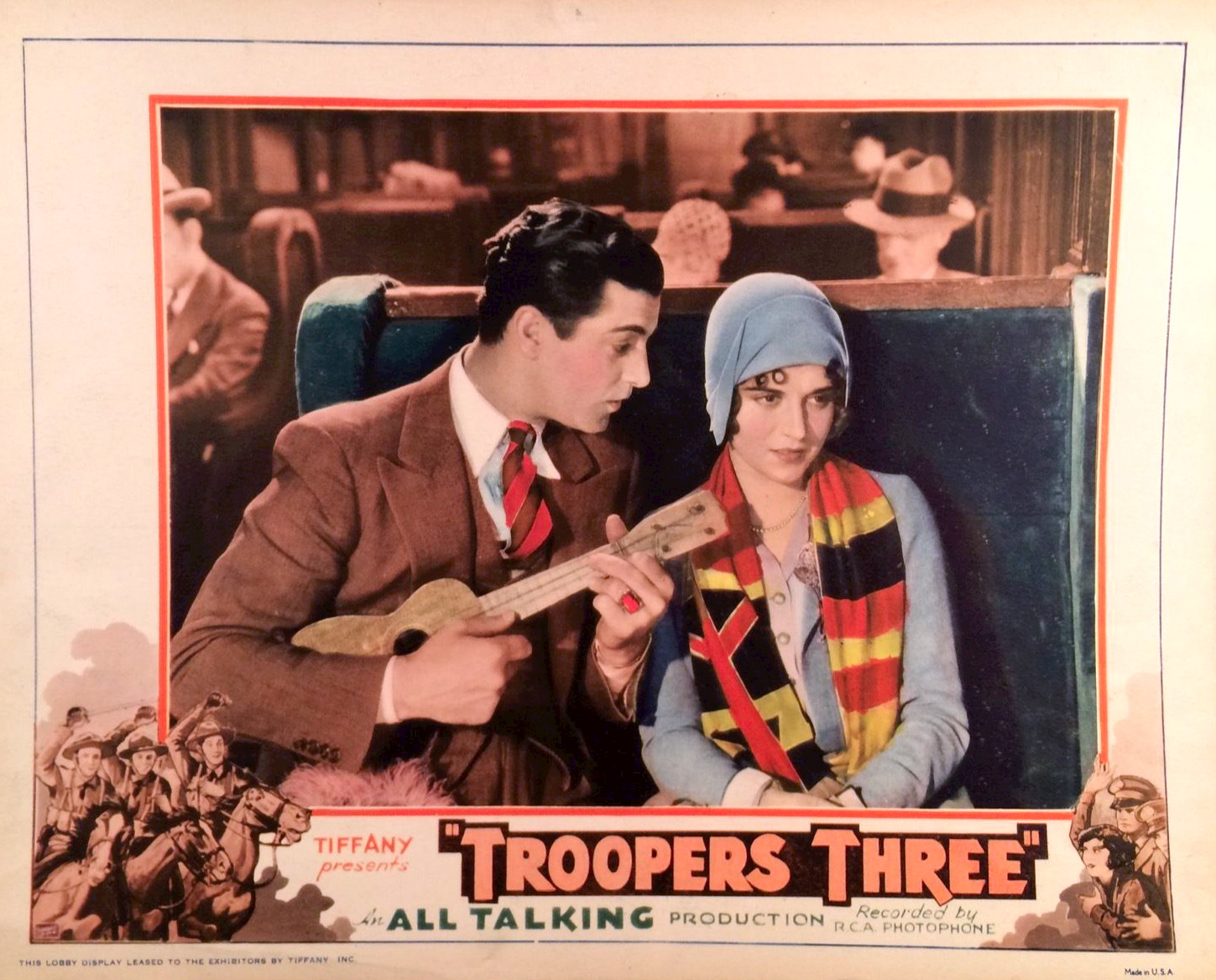
- Lobby card
- Directed by: Norman Taurog; B. Reeves Eason
- Written by: Jack Natteford (scenario)
- Story by: Arthur Guy Empey
- Produced by: Arthur Guy Empey
- Starring: Rex Lease; Roscoe Karns
- Cinematography: Benjamin H. Kline; Ernest Miller; Jackson Rose
- Edited by: Clarence Kolster
- Distributed by: Tiffany Pictures
- Release date: February 23, 1930
- Running time: 80 minutes
- Country: United States
- Language: English

Troopers Three is a 1930 American Pre-Code comedy film directed by Norman Taurog and B. Reeves Eason and produced and distributed by Tiffany Studios.

== Plot ==
Eddie Haskins, a wisecracking young man, teams up with two ham-acrobats known as 'Bugs & Sunny'. When they are all kicked out of a vaudeville theater in California, they enlist in the U. S. Cavalry.

Eddie falls in love with Dorothy Clark, the daughter of a sergeant and, following a moonlight tryst, they are discovered by Sergeant Hank Darby who himself is in love with Dorothy. They have a fist-fight in which Eddie comes out second best.

When Darby is reprimanded for fighting with an enlisted man, the troopers incorrectly think that Eddie squealed on him, and they punish him with a conspiracy of silence. Dorothy also rejects him. Eddie has a problem. Maybe a fire will break out in the stables and he can rescue Sergeant Darby.

== Cast ==
- Rex Lease as Eddie Haskins
- Dorothy Gulliver as Dorothy Clark
- Roscoe Karns as "Bugs"
- Slim Summerville as "Sunny"
- Tom London as Sgt. Hank Darby
- Joseph W. Girard as Capt. Harris (credited as Joseph Girard)
- Walter Perry as Halligan
- Murdock MacQuarrie as Army Officer

== Preservation status ==
The film exists in a mute 25-minute truncated version. The Library of Congress also has one reel of what is described as "outtakes" from the film.
