= Broadway Blues (Swanstrom and Morgan) =

C. 1918 blues song by Swanstrom & Morgan

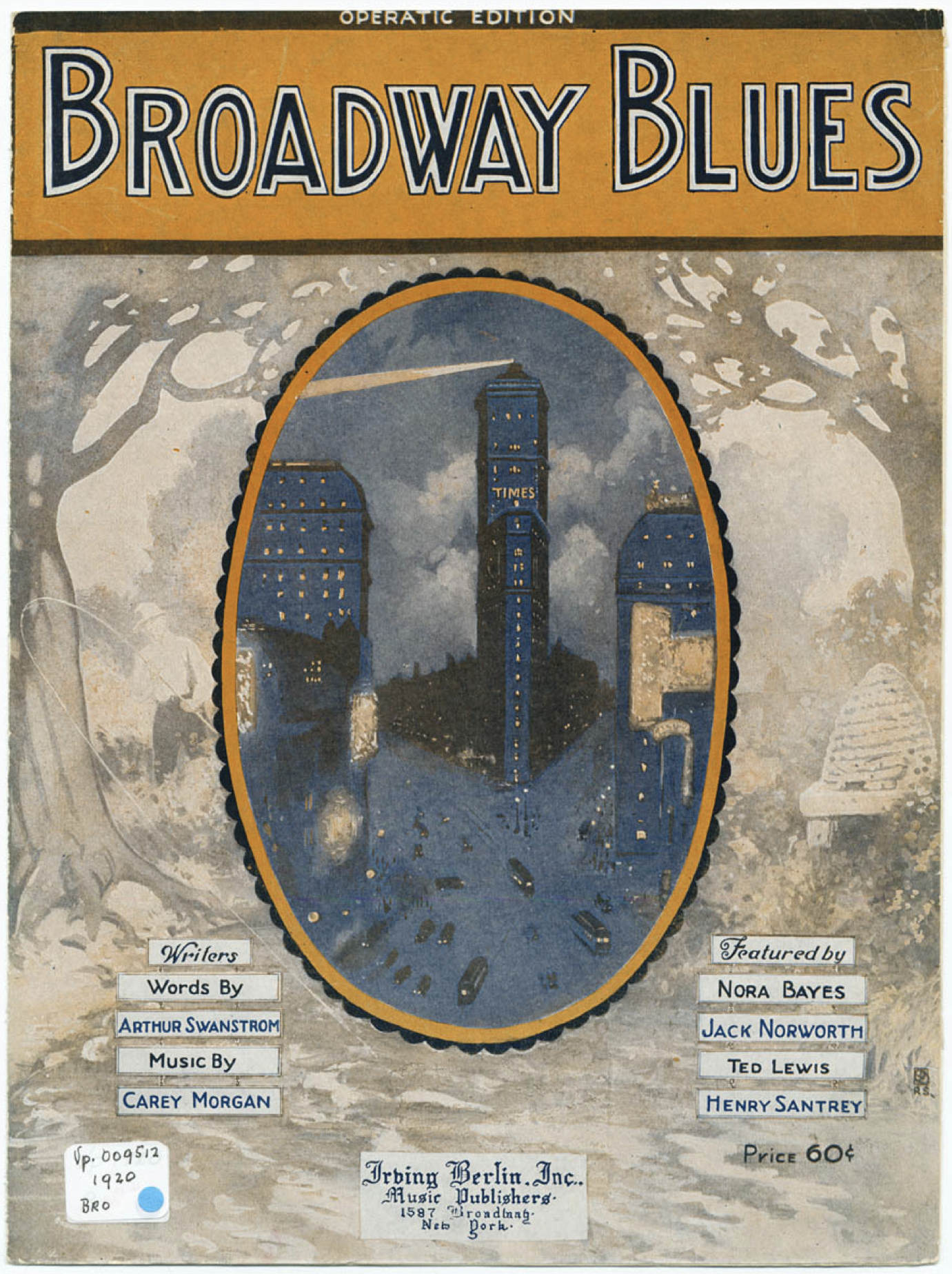
Front cover of 1920 sheet music for "Broadway Blues"

"Broadway Blues", also known as "The Broadway Blues", is a blues song with lyrics by Arthur Swanstrom and music by Carey Morgan. The song was introduced by Lillian Lorraine in Florence Ziegfeld's 1918 Broadway musical revue Ziegfeld Midnight Frolic. The song became a popular hit in 1920 with two top selling recordings that year; one made by Nora Bayes and the other made the duo of Noble Sissle and Eubie Blake. The song was also recorded in 1920 by Art Hickman and his orchestra, and it was published that year by Irving Berlin's music publishing company. In 1921 the song was interpolated into the Broadway musical revue Snapshots of 1921.

Aileen Stanley originally recorded the song in 1920 for Chicago's Mandel Manufacturing Company's phonograph player, and also recorded the song for Victor Talking Machine Company. She recorded the song again in 1922 for Black Swan Records using the pseudonym Georgia Gorham, and that same year soprano Ennis Parkes recorded it for the His Master's Voice label. Other artists associated with the song in the early 1920s included Harry Fox, Henry Santrey, Jack Norworth, and Ted Lewis.
