= The Undercurrent (1919 film) =

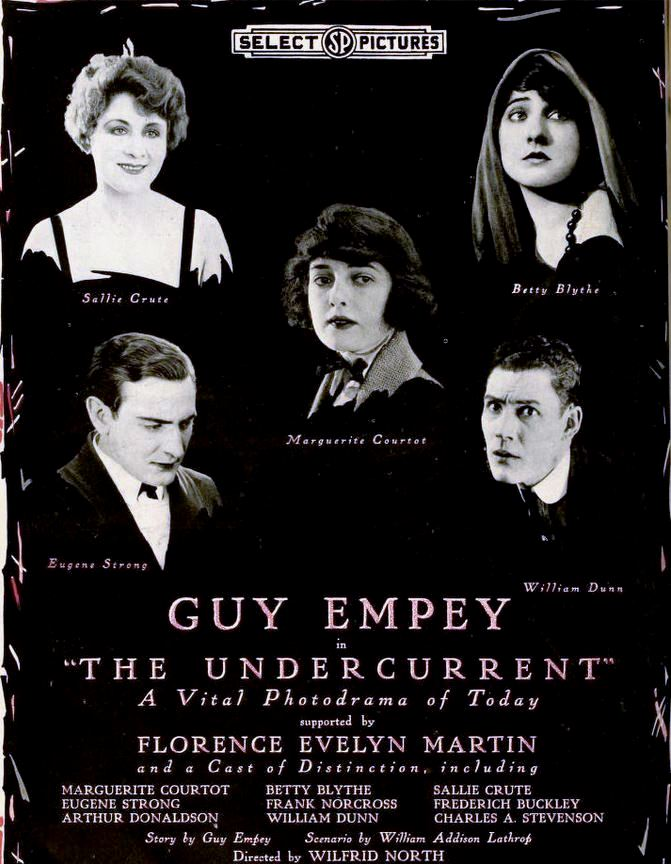
- Advertisement in Moving Picture World, 1919
- Directed by: Wilfrid North
- Written by: William Addison Lathrop (scenario)
- Starring: Arthur Guy Empey
- Cinematography: John W. Brown
- Distributed by: Select Pictures
- Release date: November 16, 1919 (United States)
- Running time: 6 reels
- Country: United States
- Language: Silent (English intertitles)

The Undercurrent was a 1919 American silent directed by Wilfrid North, produced by Guy Empey, distributed by Select Pictures. It is based on a story by Arthur Guy Empey and though fictional, is considered a sequel to Over the Top which was a 1918 movie loosely based on his autobiographical book of the same name about his own experiences in the British Army in World War I. The New York City premier was held at the Capitol Theatre and was attended by General John J. Pershing who was in New York City for the International Trade Conference of 1919.

== Red Scare ==
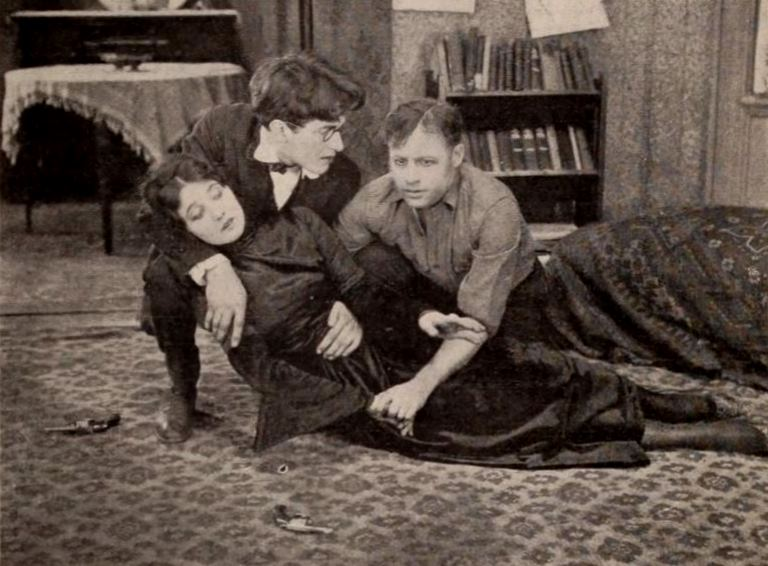
Betty Blythe, Frederick Buckley and Guy Empey in a still from The Undercurrent

The Undercurrent is one of several films from around the same period inspired by if not fanning the flames of the Red Scare which followed World War I and the Russian Revolution of 1917. It was released during the Steel strike of 1919 which the public had turned against largely due to the Red Scare. Other similarly themed films of the time include Bolshevism on Trial (1919), The Burning Question (1919), The Right to Happiness (1919), The Volcano (1919), The Red Viper (1919),The Great Shadow (1920), The Lifting Shadow (1920), and Dangerous Hours (1920).

In the November 14, 1919 issue of Variety, Charlie Chaplin found it necessary to state "I am absolutely cold on the Bolshevism theme; neither am I interested in Socialism" in order to allay fears of where his sympathies lay in regards to the making of Red Scare films.

Empey publicly endorsed deportation for radicals and said "My motto for the Reds is S.O.S. - Ship Or Shot".

== Plot ==
Jack Duncan, a returning World War I veteran joins a group of Bolsheviks. He soon grows disillusioned with the organization and denounces it cause. Mariska, a Russian agent who, upon learning that the authorities are about to arrest her, shoots a fellow provocateur and then turns the weapon on herself.

== Cast ==
- Betty Blythe as Mariska
- Vera Boehm as Jack Duncan Jr.
- Frederick Buckley as Paris Thann
- Marguerite Courtot as Fanny Brett
- Sally Crute as Sylvia Loring
- Arthur Donaldson as Malin
- William Dunn as Ivan
- Guy Empey as Jack Duncan
- Betty Hutchinson as Mrs. Loring
- Harry Lee as Smith
- Florence Evelyn Martin as Lucy Duncan
- Frank Norcross as Marinoff
- Charles A. Stevenson as John Loring
- Eugene Strong as Edward Taylor
