= Sipping Cider Through a Straw (1919 song) =

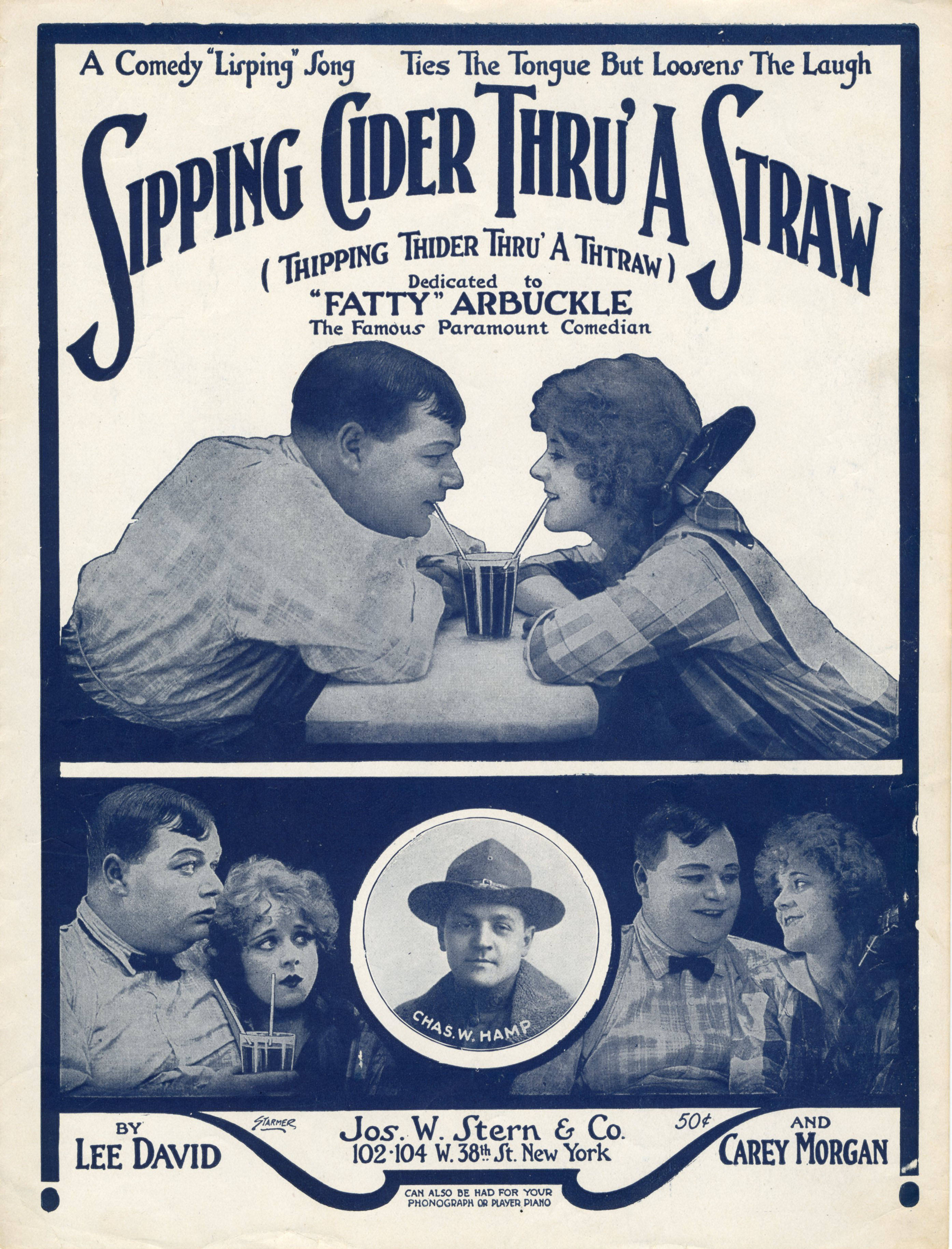

Song
- Published: 1919
- Genre: Novelty
- Songwriter(s): Lee David and Carey Morgan

"Sipping Cider Thru' a Straw" is a 1919 novelty song, also called "Thipping Thider Thru a Thtraw", composed by Tin Pan Alley songwriters Carey Morgan (1885–1960) and Lee David (1891–1978) and published by Joseph W. Stern & Co.

The lyrics of this song are reminiscent of, but not identical to, those of an earlier song with the same title. The form of the Morgan-David song is strophic with a chorus; the first line is "Sweetest girl I ever saw, Was selling cider in a groc'ry store". The music composed by David and Morgan is original, bearing no resemblance to the earlier song.

Collins and Harlan sang the only notable recordings of this song. Their renditions appeared on several labels: Operaphone (21119, b/w "Katydid is the Candy Kid"), Emerson (catalog 7536, as "Thipping Thider Thru a Thtraw"), Edison (both Diamond and Blue Amberol), and Pathé (22157, w/a "Gimme This, Gimme This, Gimme That" by Billy Murray).
