= Lucille Cavanagh =

American dancer and singer

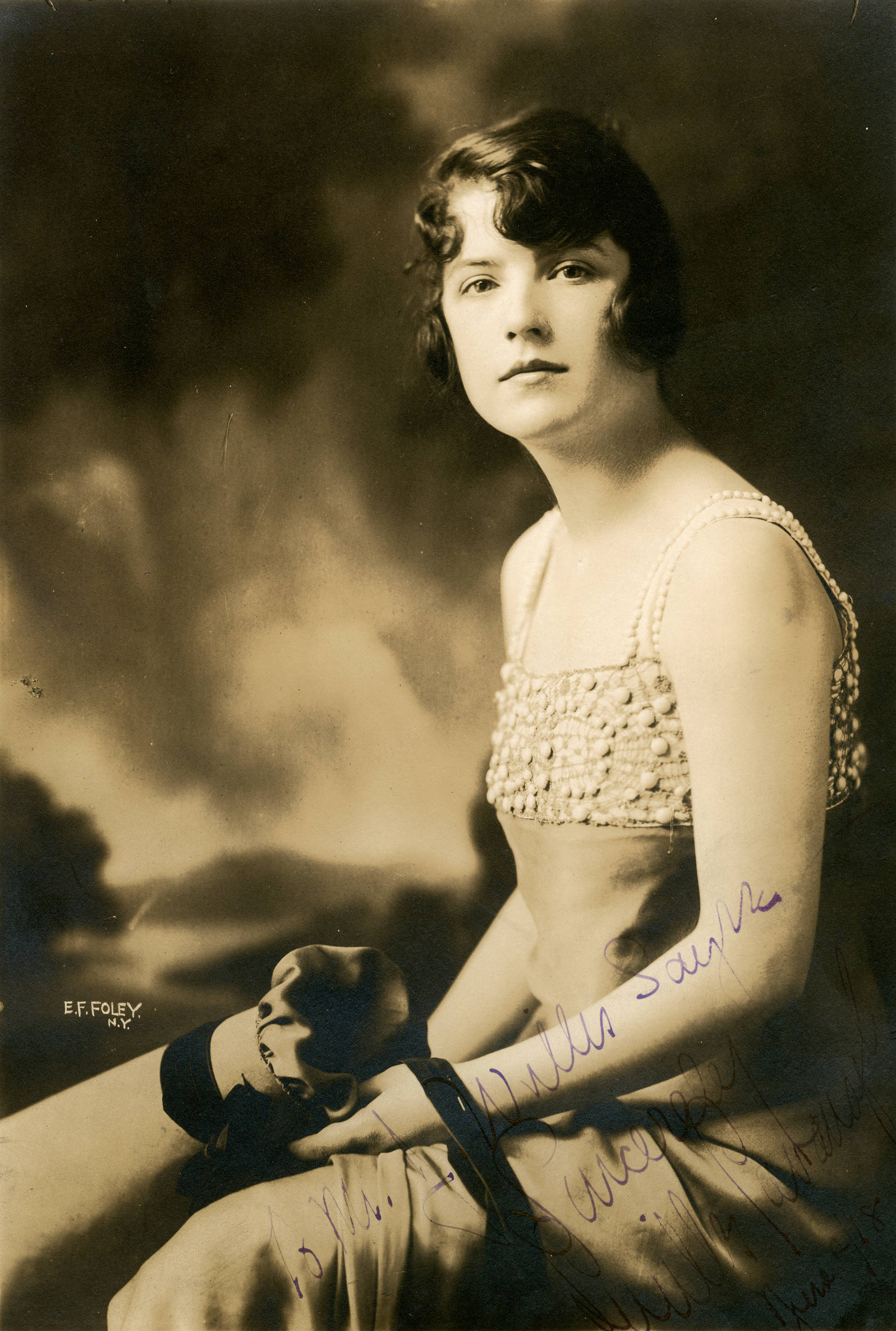
- Cavanagh in 1915
- Born: October 6, 1895; St. Louis, Missouri, U.S.
- Died: July 13, 1983 (aged 87); Carmel, California, U.S.
- Other name: Lucille Leimert
- Occupations: Dancer; singer; actress; columnist
- Years active: 1919–1921
- Spouse: Walter H. Leimert (m. 1919; died 1970)
- Children: 2

Lucille Cavanagh (October 6, 1895 – July 13, 1983) was an American dancer and singer on the vaudeville stage. Later, as Lucille Leimert, she was a columnist for the Los Angeles Times.

== Early life ==
Lucille Cavanagh was born and raised in St. Louis, Missouri. Her younger sister, Marie Cavanagh, followed her into vaudeville as a dancer.

== Stage career ==
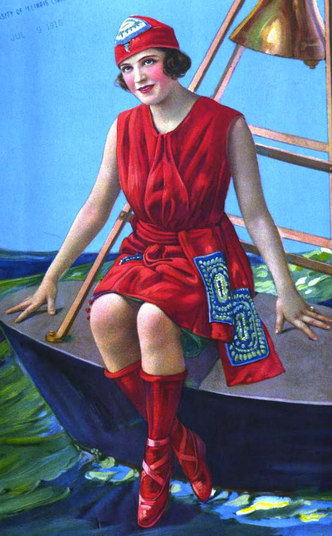
Cavanagh, on the cover of a 1918 publication.

Cavanagh danced with George White in vaudeville. She was nationally known as a youthful beauty, enough to endorse a soap brand, Sempre Giovine, in print advertisements. Her song and dance act headlined variety shows in New York, Chicago, and San Francisco in 1918 and 1919, billed as "the Darling of the Dance". Her act, "Kaleidoscope of Dance", featured brightly-colored costumes designed by Lady Duff Gordon, and music by songwriter Dave Stamper.

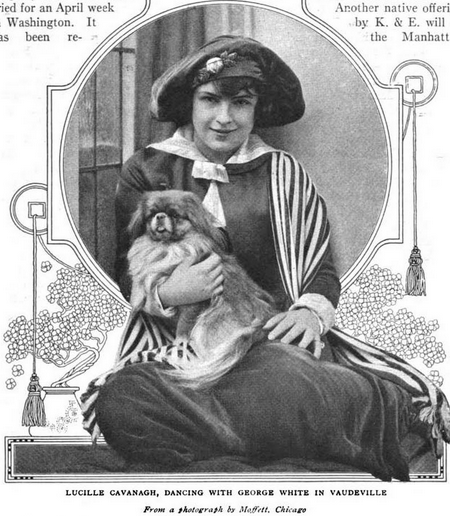
Lucille Cavanagh, seated with a small dog, from a 1916 publication.

Critic Nellie Revell described Cavanagh's act in 1917: "She sets up a fairyland castle with huge gates, and therefrom she conjures a wardrobe to make even the most fashionable rainbow-clad ladies of fairyland jealous. There are effects in Russian, Spanish, and American — Miss Cavanagh dances in all languages... There are songs too, which Miss Cavanagh delivers in a delightfully distracted out-of-breath manner, mingled with apologetic ripples of laughter."

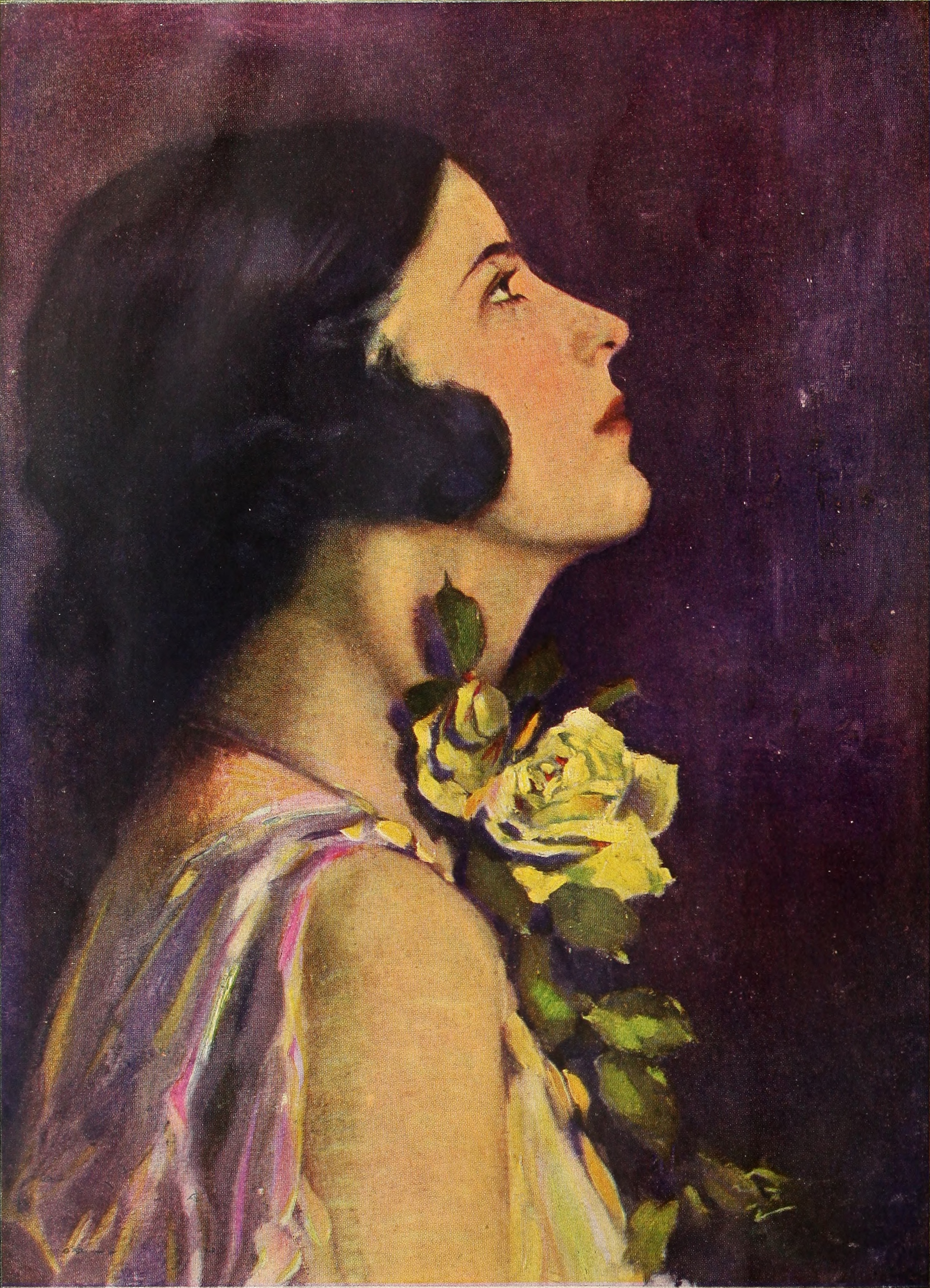
Portrait of Cavanagh from a photograph by Hiron-Connelly, 1920.

Cavanagh aspired to a film career, and appeared in one silent film, Leave It to Me (1920). By then, she was married and retired from the stage. In 1921 she was a charter member of the All Arts Club in San Francisco.

== Los Angeles society and newspaper work ==
Later in life, Lucille Leimert was active in the Junior League of Los Angeles, serving as its president in 1930. She was a columnist for the Los Angeles Times, writing the "Soundings" and "Confidentially" columns until she retired in 1947. She also covered political conventions and the organization of the United Nations. She flew with aviator Jacqueline Cochran on assignments for the Times, and in 1946 wrote a series of columns from Hawaii, while recovering from a fall off an elephant's back.

== Personal life ==
Lucille Cavanagh married California real estate developer Walter H. Leimert in 1919, at St. Patrick's Cathedral in New York. They had two children, Walter Jr. and Patricia. In 1923, the Leimert family were among the first to live at the Biltmore Hotel in Los Angeles, while their home in Hancock Park was under construction. Lucille Cavanagh Leimert was widowed in 1970, and died in 1983, aged 87 years, in Carmel, California.
