= Sea Legs =

Sea Legs is an American musical with music by Michael H. Cleary and lyrics by Arthur Swanstrom. The musical book by Swanstrom is based on the play The Cat Came Back by Laurence E. Johnson, Beula King, and Avery Hopwood. Produced by Albert Bannister and J. Edmund Byrne, the production opened on Broadway at the Mansfield Theatre where it ran from May 18, 1937, through May 29, 1937 for a total of 15 performances.

The cast included Dorothy Stone and her husband, Charles Collins.
