= Arthur Guy Empey =

American writer (1883–1963)

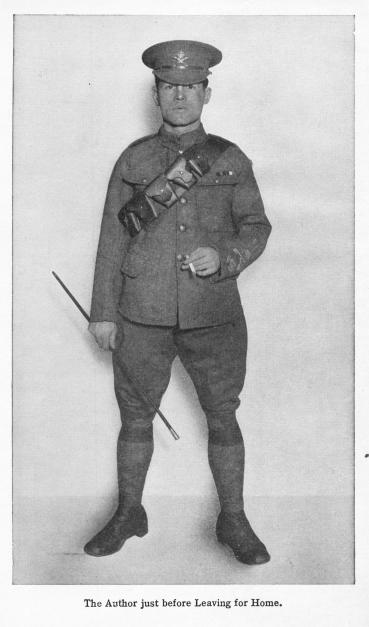
- From Over the Top, 1917
- Born: 11 December 1883
- Died: 22 February 1963 (aged 79)
- Military career
- Allegiance: United States; United Kingdom
- Branch: United States Army; British Army
- Conflicts: World War I

Arthur Guy Empey (December 11, 1883 – February 22, 1963) was an American soldier, author, actor and filmmaker. He served with the British Army during World War I, and upon his return wrote a popular autobiographical book, Over the Top, which sold over a quarter million copies. He penned lyrics to several patriotic songs, and wrote, produced or directed several silent films including The Undercurrent (1919) and Troopers Three (1930).

== Early life ==
Arthur Guy Empey Born in Ogden, Utah, on 11 December 1883 to Rose Empey (née Dana) and Robert Empey. He served for six years as a professional soldier in the U.S. Cavalry, during which time he became a first class horse-rider and marksman, and was resident in New York City performing duty as a recruiting sergeant for the New Jersey National Guard when World War I began.

== World War 1 service with the British Army ==
He left the United States at the end of 1915 frustrated at its neutrality in the conflict at that point and traveled to London, England, where he voluntarily enlisted with the 1st London Regiment (Royal Fusiliers), T.F., of the British Army, going on to serve with it in the 56th (London) Division on the Western Front as a bomber and a machine-gunner. He was medically discharged from the British Army after being wounded in action at the commencement of the Battle of the Somme. Empey's military awards include the Silver War Badge (1916); British War Medal and the Victory Medal.

== Return home and U.S. Army service ==
In late January 1917, the Newspaper Enterprise Association began syndicating a series of "letters" by Empey, telling of his war experiences, to U.S. publications, and around that time, Empey began a lecture tour, entitled "Over the Top, with the Best of Luck." In June 1917, two months after the United States declared war on Germany, G.P Putnam and Sons published Empey's letters as a book, Over the Top, which became a publishing sensation in 1917 with over a quarter of a million copies sold.

Empey had attempted to re-join the US Army in 1917 but was rejected due to his wounds. On the basis of the book's success he played a major propaganda role for the Federal Government's policy of moving the nation from a position of neutrality in World War I to a combatant role, and toured widely throughout the U.S.A. giving public performances and readings from it to rally the American people to the nation's entry into the conflict.

On February 14, 1918 Empey enlisted as a Sergeant in the 358th Battalion in the U.S. Army Tank Corp and was discharged in 1919. In July 1918 he was commissioned with the rank of captain in the U.S. Army's Adjutant General's Department, but the commission was withdrawn three days later.

There was speculation in the press at the time that this was done because whilst appearing in a theatre performance entitled Pack Up Your Troubles, Empey had given a speech from the stage praising American volunteers but criticizing the draftees, suggesting that the latter lacked the right stuff because rather than volunteering they had waited "until they were fetched"; in the audience was President Woodrow Wilson who had apparently been unimpressed with the speech's content.

== Hollywood ==
On the back of the commercial success of Over the Top Empey arrived in Hollywood in 1918 to star in a dramatic filmed production using the book's title (the melodramatic screenplay that was used bore only a passing resemblance to the book's content) by the Vitagraph Company of America. He was also briefly a popular songwriter during the war years, writing the lyrics for hits such as "Your Lips Are No Man's Land But Mine", "Liberty Statue is Looking Right at You", and "Our Country's In It Now, We've Got To Win It Now". After this, he set his ambition upon a career in cinema production and established his own production company - The Guy Empey Pictures Corporation - with the money he had made from Over the Top's royalties. Throughout the 1920s he worked in the rapidly developing film production industry that Hollywood was becoming, initially acting in his own productions, and subsequently working behind the camera producing, writing and directing silent films such as: The Undercurrent (1919), Millionaire for a Day (1921), The Midnight Flier (1925), Into No Man's Land (1928), and Troopers Three (1930). However, the revolution in film-making that took place with the introduction of sound film at the end of the 1920s, combined with the increasing competition in Hollywood as its gathering financial power attracted professional talent able to work in the new audio-visual medium from across the world, spelled the end of Empey's career there, apparently unable to adapt to the new changed environment along with many others from the Classical Hollywood Silent Era.

== Pulp-fiction writer ==
In the late-1920s, as his Hollywood film career was dwindling, Empey shifted into a new creative direction on being commissioned to write World War I themed pulp fiction stories, creating the character Terence X. O'Leary. The character appeared in several publications, including War Stories (Dell), and in Battle Stories (Fawcett), with the Infantryman O'Leary also doing duty as a Military Policeman, Secret Service Agent and Foreign Legionnaire. The character also appeared as a heroic aviator in the magazine War Birds (Pub. Dell), the magazine being re-titled Terence X. O'Leary's War Birds in an attempt to revamp its falling sales. With the use of O'Leary's name in the publication's titling War Birds also underwent a radical shift in genre from being set in a World War I scenario to one of futuristic science fiction, with a storyline of O'Leary defying:-

"Unuk, High Priest to the God of the Depths, a 500-year-old madman who has seized an island in the South Pacific, kidnapped scientists and turned them into zombies to perfect amazing weapons to attack the United States,"

in O'Leary Fights the Golden Ray (1935). The O'Leary Dyno-Blaster, or Adventure of the Ageless Men (1935) followed. The format ended after the third issue The Purple Warriors of Neptunia (1935). After this the Sci-fi genre was abandoned by the publishers as it had not been a commercial success, and Empey re-wrote O'Leary fully back into a World War I setting for issues of the War Stories and Battle Stories titles, but with public interest in the subject of World War 1 receding and sales falling, the character was dropped by the publishers in 1936 and Empey's services were dispensed with. Ernest Hemingway rated Over the Top as "a pitiful piece of bravado writing" but, among the products of propaganda writers of World War I, "the nearest thing to usable material." (Hemingway, Ernest, Men at War, New York [Crown Publishers], 1942, p. xv.).

== Politico-military activity ==
In early 1935 Empey, concerned about the growing influence of World Communism in America with its potential for civil strife, and possessing social connections with the Hollywood film production community, organised a volunteer paramilitary uniformed militia cavalry unit called the Hollywood Hussars, with himself as its Colonel. As well as a horse-cavalry arm (ostensibly organized around the sport of polo) the unit possessed a medical team for the treatment of casualties, a signals team, motor-cycle dispatch riders, military style police and an intelligence unit. How the organization funded itself was obscure, but there were persistent rumors of the covert involvement of William Randolph Hearst. On its membership roll was Victor McLaglen (who also possessed his own militia unit at that time called The California Light Horse Regiment), Gary Cooper, Ward Bond, with Ted Parsons as its personnel officer. The Hollywood Hussars' charter drawn up by Empey specifically forbade any involvement with opposing labor disputes, however Empey briefed the press that they were: "Armed to the teeth and ready to gallop within an hour on horseback to any emergency threatening the safety of the community. Fights or strikes, floods, earthquakes, war, a Japanese invasion or a Communistic revolution." Headquartered at the Hollywood Athletic Club, they described themselves as a volunteer "military-social unit, devoted to the advancement of American ideals". Gary Cooper quit the unit a few months after joining following attacks upon it by the left-wing press with calls for targeted boycotts of his films, publicly stating that: "the Hussars are not the social group that I had thought they were, the men behind it are trying to organize a national, semi-military organization of a political nature". In response, Empey confirmed that it was his intention to expand the organization nationally, but denied that it was politically driven or had any sympathy with the Fascist movements that were engulfing the European continent at that time (this had been a charge made by far-left critics).

== Later life ==
In 1943, during World War II, Empey was employed as a security guard at the Vega Aircraft Corporation's factory at Burbank, California.

Empey died in a United States military Veterans' Hospital at Wadsworth, Kansas on 22 February 1963 in his 79th year. His body was buried in the Leavenworth National Cemetery.

== Personal life ==
Empey married Marguerite Andrus, Hollywood actress (professional name Patricia Archer) and former "Miss Long Beach" beauty contest winner, in March 1930, they were subsequently divorced in Los Angeles, in October 1934. The marriage produced a daughter, the model and dancer Diane Webber.

== Notable works ==
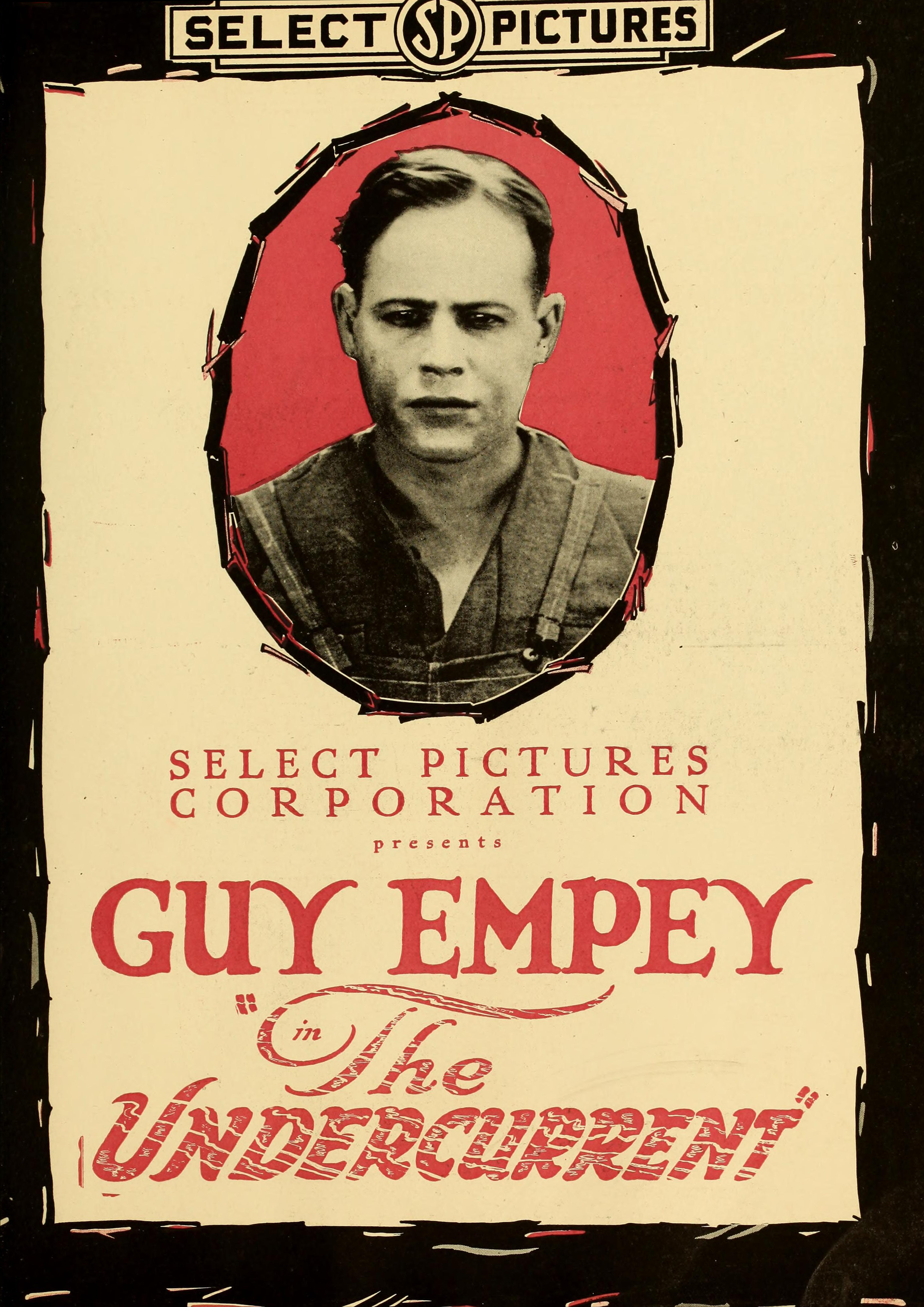
Advertisement for The Undercurrent (1919)

- Books
  - Over the Top (1917)
  - First Call: Guideposts to Berlin (1918)
  - Tales from a Dugout (1918)
  - The Madonna of the Hills: the Story of a New York Cabaret Girl (1921)
  - A Helluva War (1926)
- Films
  - Over the Top (1918) (writer and actor)
  - The Undercurrent (1919) (producer, writer and actor)
  - Millionaire For a Day (1921) (producer, writer and actor)
  - Troopers Three (1930) (producer and writer)
- Pulp Fiction
  - O'Leary Proves his Courage (1927) (Pub. 'War Stories)
  - Hinky Dinkie Parlez Vous (1928) (Pub. 'Battle Stories')
  - Terence X. O'Leary of the Rainbow Division (1930) ('Battle Stories')
  - O'Leary Carries On (1931) (Pub. 'War Stories')
  - O'Leary Secret Service (1932) (Pub. 'War Stories')
  - O'Leary's Rough Riders (1932) (Pub. Battle Stories')
  - O'Leary, Wagon-Soldier (1932) (Pub. 'War Stories')
  - Y.M.C.A. Goes Over the Top (1932)
  - The Curse of the Iron Cross (1932) (Pub. 'Battle Stories')
  - The Fightin' Irish Son-of-a-Gun (1932) (Pub. 'Battle Stories')
  - Terence X. O'Leary Tank Busters (1933) (Pub. 'Battle Stories')
  - O'Leary Flies a Ghost (1933) (Pub. 'War Birds')
  - Terence X. O'Leary's War Birds (1935)
  - O'Leary Tames the Bouche (1935) ('Battle Stories')
