= Carey Morgan =

American composer and Vaudeville producer

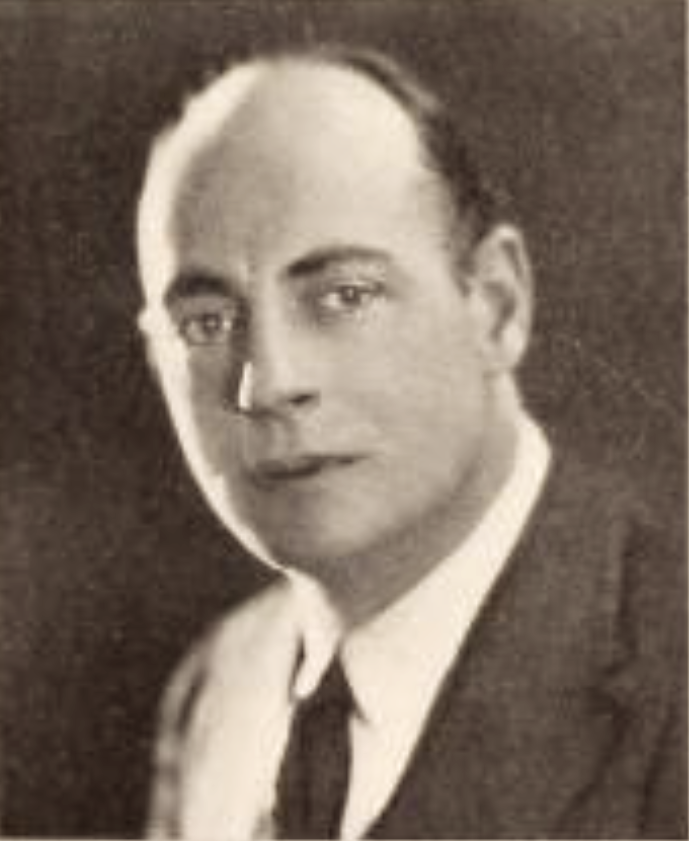
- Born: December 25, 1884; Brownsburg, Indiana
- Died: January 6, 1960 (aged 75); Pittsburgh, Pennsylvania
- Occupations: Composer, vaudeville producer, and salesman

Carey Elmore Morgan Jr. (1884–1960) was an American composer and Vaudeville producer during the 1900s. Throughout his career, he collaborated with various songwriters and performers including, L. Wolfe Gilbert, Charles McCarron, and Arthur Monday Swanstrom.

== Early life ==
According to Indiana birth records, Morgan was born on December 25, 1884. His World War I draft registration would list his date of birth as December 25, 1885. Morgan was born in Brownsburg, Indiana to Christian minister Dr. Carey Elmore Morgan Sr. (1860–1925) and Ella May (Mai) Dailey (1865–?). He was the eldest child. His siblings were Walter Dailey (1886–1963) and Ruth (1892–1947).

Due to his father's occupation, the family moved often. They lived in Indiana till late 1892 when Dr. Morgan was assigned to Portland Avenue Church of Christ in Minneapolis, Minnesota. In 1897, they returned to Indiana, but two years later they would move again. This time his father was assigned to serve at a church in Richmond, Virginia. In 1903, the family relocated to Paris, Kentucky.

Morgan's name is listed in the Kappa Sigma fraternity book of addresses. He attended Kentucky University.

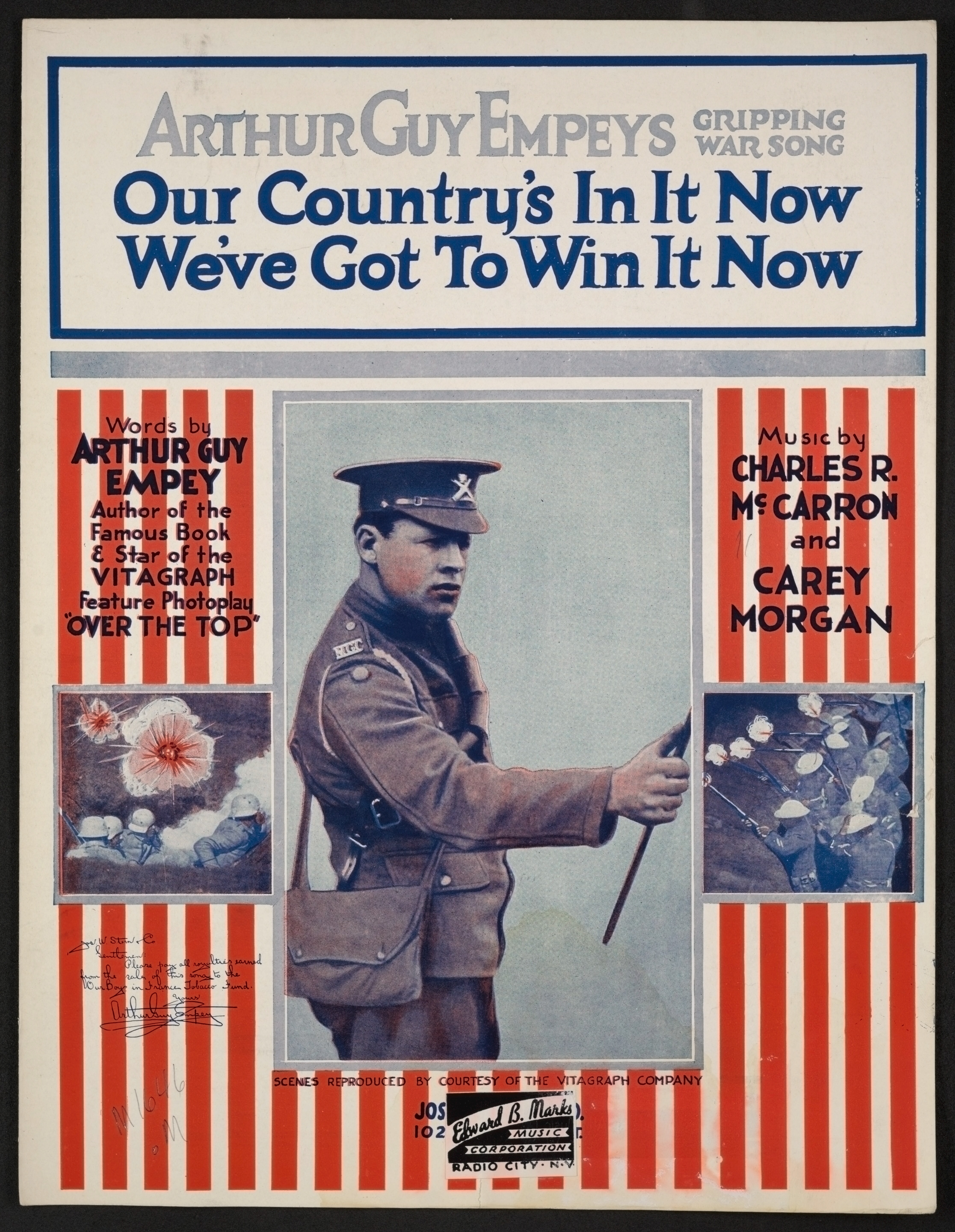
"Our Country's in It Now! (We've Got to Win It Now)" cover (1918); music by Morgan

== Career ==
In April 1904, Morgan moved back to Richmond, where he began a job as either a typewriter or salesman. In September 1907, he moved to Salt Lake City, Utah, where he worked as a representative of Oliver Typewriter Company. By 1910, he had returned to Paris, Kentucky, to live with his parents. He took job as a commercial traveler for wholesale shows, but soon moved to Kansas for another job.

The following year, Morgan was living in Manhattan, New York with his younger brother Walter. Morgan began his songwriting career with him in 1913. Their song, "On a Rainy Day", was performed by Vaudeville actor Harry Puck. This connected Carey to the publishing house of Joseph W. Stern, whom he would later write songs for. In this same year, the Morgan brothers had three songs published in New York. Their song, "The Brazilian" was featured by Vernon and Irene Castle, and gained popularity due to the trend of Tango songs at the time.

From 1914 to 1915, Morgan composed a handful of successful songs: "Florence Maxixe", "Dicty Doo", and "Trilby Rag". Many of his songs released at this time were forgotten. At this time, Morgan worked in Manhattan as a type salesman.

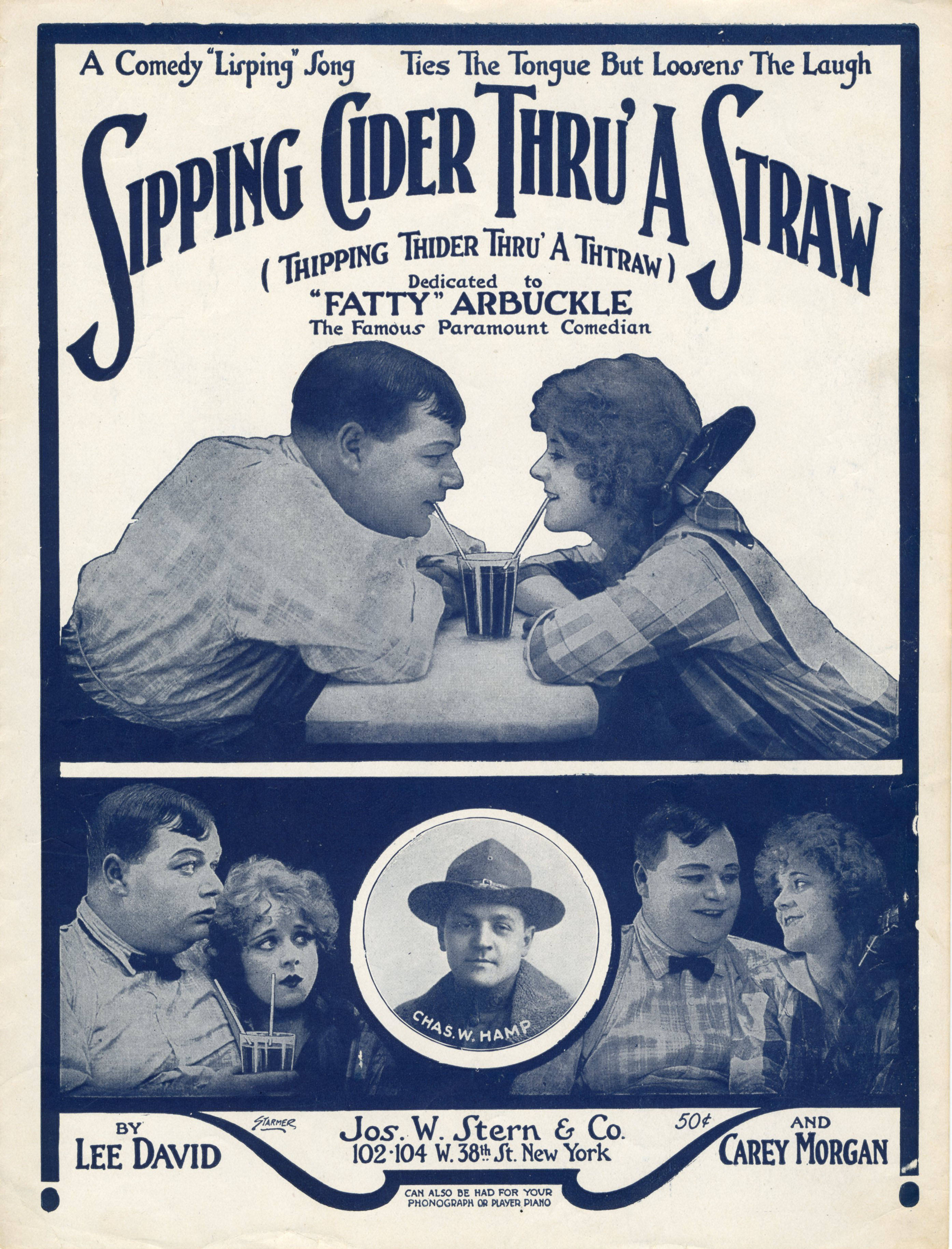
Sheet music cover - "Sipping Cider Thru' A Straw" (1919) composed by Morgan

Between 1916 and 1917, Morgan collaborated with L.Wolfe Gilbert. The two wrote many songs together including, "Hawaiian Sunshine", "Yaaka Hula Hickey Dula", "My Own Iona", and "I've Got the Army Blues". He also worked with Charles R. McCarron from 1918 to 1919. The two would write the popular song, "I'm Glad I Can Make You Cry".

Perhaps his most successful partnership was with vaudevillian Arthur Swanstrom. They would go on to write and produce vaudeville sketches together. Their collaboration began in 1913, but it was not until 1917 when they would prove to be a popular duo. Morgan usually played the piano or conducted the orchestra while Swanstrom sang. Their tune, "Broadway Blues", was introduced in 1918 but didn't become a hit song until 1920.

Their "Dance Duet", starring Irene Franklin made its debut in 1920, but was poorly received. Fortunately, their musical comedy, "The Greenwich Village Follies", earned positive reviews. This led the two to focus more on producing shows than writing songs. Over the following years Swanstrom and Morgan would produce the revues, "Figure It Out" (1922), "Her Personal Appearance" (1923), and "Sadie - One of Those Girls" (1923). Their next major hit came in 1924 with "Honeymoon Cruise", starring Bennie Fields and Blossom Seely. It was produced by Ned Wayburn and ran at the Palace Theatre. Their final collaboration was in 1928 with the "Lone Dancer".

Two of Morgan's songs, "Oh, Helen!" and "Sipping Cider thru a Straw", were endorsed by actor Roscoe "Fatty" Arbuckle. The comedian's face was featured on the sheet music cover for "Oh, Helen!" and their song was associated with one of his films.

Morgan enlisted in the United States Navy during World War I and was stationed in France. From then on, he was credited with U.S.N. after his name as seen inside the sheet music for "Oh, Helen!". His title was Chief Quartermaster.

By 1925, Morgan was an employee of L.B. Typewriter Company of New York. In 1930, he took a job with the Royal Typewriter Company, where his brother worked.

Songwriter Frank Loesser credited Morgan as being an influence on his career; specifically Morgan's "low-brow appreciation of high-brow art", which unleashed Loesser's talent. He became known for being a "high-brow writer of low-brow songs". Loesser wrote the popular Christmas song, "Baby, It's Cold Outside".

== Personal life ==
In 1918, Morgan married singer and actress, Madeline Florence Fliege in France. This was where Morgan was stationed during World War I. His parents traveled to France to attend the wedding. The couple had two children: Madeline Carey (1920–1996) and Carylin (1927–?).

The 1920 census showed Morgan living in New York, New York, with his wife and brother-in-law, Harold.

Census records listed the couple as living separately in 1940 and 1942. Morgan listed his home address in Manhattan, and his wife's address in Asbury Park, New Jersey. The two would remain married, but separated till Morgan's death.

Morgan died on either January 5 or 6, 1960, in Pittsburgh, Pennsylvania. His cause of death was congestive heart failure. He is buried at Hamilton Cemetery in Neptune Township, New Jersey.

== Selected works ==
- "Sipping Cider Thru' a Straw". (1919). with Lee David. Joseph W. Stern & Co.
- "The Other Day I Met a Bear". (1919). with Lee David.
- "Our Country's in It Now! (We've Got to Win It Now)". (1918). with Arthur Guy Empey and Charles R. McCarron. Joseph W. Stern & Co.
- "Bugle Call Rag". with Eubie Blake.
