= Carll House =

Carll House can refer to:

in the United States

(by state then city)

- Carll House (Dix Hills, New York), listed on the National Register of Historic Places (NRHP)
- Carll House (Huntington, New York), NRHP-listed
- Ezra Carll Homestead, Huntington Station, New York, NRHP-listed
- Marion Carll Farm, Commack, New York, NRHP-listed
