= Burr House =

Burr House or Burr Mansion may refer to:

- Burr House (San Francisco, California) also known as Burr Mansion, designated as one of San Francisco's official landmarks, and listed on NRHP in San Francisco
- Burr House (Dodge City, Kansas), listed on the NRHP in Ford County, Kansas
- Carll S. Burr Mansion, Commack, New York, NRHP-listed
- Carll Burr Jr. House, Commack, New York, NRHP-listed
- Theodore Burr House, Oxford, New York, NRHP-listed
- George Burr House, Lodi, Ohio, listed on the NRHP in Medina County, Ohio
- Peterson–Burr House, Salina, Utah, listed on the NRHP in Sevier County, Utah
- Peter Burr House, Shenandoah Junction, West Virginia, NRHP-listed

== See also ==
- Burr Block, Lincoln, Nebraska, listed on the NRHP in Lancaster County, Nebraska
- Burr Cave, Walker, Washington, listed on the NRHP in Washington
