= Smith Burr =

American horse breeder and hotelier (1803-1887)

- Born: Smith Burr; September 22, 1803; Commack, Suffolk County, New York, U.S.
- Died: April 6, 1887 (aged 83); Commack, Suffolk County, New York, U.S.
- Occupations: Horse breeder; horse trainer
- Known for: Horse breeding
- Political party: Republican Party
- Children: 14
- Relatives: Carll S. Burr Jr. (grandson)

Smith Burr (September 22, 1803 – April 6, 1887) was an American horse breeder and hotelier.

== Early life ==
Smith Burr was born on September 22, 1803, in Commack, New York, United States.

His lineage traced back to Benjamin Burr, an early Massachusetts settler who came to New England aboard the Winthrop Fleet in 1630. He was also related to Aaron Burr. His side of the family settled on Long Island in the 1700s, eventually holding significant farmland in East Northport and Commack. His grandfather, Isaac Burr, settled in Commack, New York and acquired a 166-acre farm. The Burr family went on to occupy the farm in Commack for nearly two centuries.

As a young man, Smith Burr was an enthusiast of thoroughbred horse racing. He was among the thousands of spectators at the Fashion Course in 1823 who witnessed the race between Eclipse and Sir Henry.

== Career ==
Burr managed his Long Island farm and a hotel at Townline and Burr Roads. He established a breeding program on his farm and produced Engineer II, the sire of Lady Suffolk, one of the most famous racehorses of the mid-1800s. He had a talent for selecting good horses.

By the 1840s, Burr had earned a reputation in America as a pioneer in breeding light harness horses. In Commack, he bred Burr's Washington 332 who was foaled in 1843 by Burr's Napoleon, a son of Young Mambrino.

At the 1853 American Institute of the City of New York livestock show, Burr received 1st premium, earning a silver cup for the best three-year-old colt and a certificate for his stallion Columbus. Columbus, one of Burr's prized horses, went for $3,000 to buyers in Detroit, Michigan. Around this time, two full sister fillies by Burr's Napoleon were purchased by a supporter of Napoleon III and presented to the French Emperor, who prized and drove them in his prime.

He owned a trotting track in Smithtown, New York for many years. In the 1840s and 1850s, he became known as a driver on the Union Course and Centreville Course in Jamaica, Queens. He handled the trotters Suffolk Queen, Lady Suffolk, Rose of Washington, Dutchman, Lady Woodruff, Old Messenger, Columbus, Black Harry, and many others.

His son, Carll S. Burr Sr., succeeded him in the family enterprise. He expanded the family stables into a business that drew clients like the Vanderbilts, Morgans, and U.S. Presidents Grover Cleveland and Ulysses S. Grant.

== Political career ==
Burr, once a Whig, joined the Republican Party in the 1850s and held firm to the party's values throughout his life. During the Crimean War, he vocally supported abolition. He spent much of his career as overseer of highways, under whose direction many of Commack's notable roads were built. He was also elected school trustee multiple times and served as one of the trustees for the township of Huntington, New York, in 1852, 1855, 1859, and 1860.

== Personal life ==
His first marriage was to Huldah Soper on January 10, 1824, with whom he had six children: Emeline, Ann M., Eliza, Carl S., George P., and Elizabeth. Following her death in 1836, he married Lavinia Soper of New York and had eight children: Elmina C., James B., Brewster R., Andrew R., Franklin S., Frederick B., Evelina, and Josephine.

His grandson was American politician Carll S. Burr Jr.

== Death ==
Smith Burr died in Commack, New York, United States, on April 6, 1887.

== Legacy ==
Smith Burr established the Burr family's reputation in the horse industry. He was among the first to realize that breeding horses for trotting speed could become a major business. The name Burr held national prestige for three generations in harness racing and the breeding of trotting horses.

Burr owned foundation stock trotting horses such as the renowned Napoleon, Washington, and Columbus.

Credited with building the first sulky in America, Burr repurposed a doctor's gig, removing the top and altering the structure to create a lighter, faster rig. His grandson, Carl, noted that the design was a major breakthrough for trotters. Burr also believed light equipment was essential to developing speed.
