= Grey Mare =

Grey Mare or Gray Mare may refer to:

- Grey Mare's Tail (disambiguation), the name of several waterfalls
- The Grey Mare and her Colts, a megalithic chambered long barrow in Dorset, England
- "The Old Gray Mare", an American folk song
- Old Grey Mare, York, a pub in North Yorkshire, England
- Greymare, Queensland, a rural locality in the Southern Downs Region, Queensland, Australia
- Lady Suffolk (1833–1855), an American trotting horse, also known as "Old Gray Mare"
