= Hunting Park Course =

Former horse racing course in Philadelphia, Pennsylvania

- Location: Old York Road, Philadelphia, Pennsylvania, U.S.
- Date opened: 1808
- Course type: Harness racing

Hunting Park Course, formerly known as Allen's Race Course, was a harness racing track in Philadelphia, Pennsylvania.

== History ==
Originally known as Allen's Race Course, the race track was established in 1808. Located in North Philadelphia, it occupied forty-five acres at the northeast corner of Old York Road and Nicetown Lane. When Mr. Allen died, the property not only changed owners but also adopted the new name "Hunting Park Course."

On September 25, 1810, at Allen's Racecourse, the future Hunting Park, a chestnut horse trotted a mile in 2:48½, breaking a four-year New York record and earning $600, placing Pennsylvania on the national sporting map.

Hunting Park Course made history as the first American track designed exclusively for trotting over a full mile. The course measured fifty feet over a mile for saddle racing and was even longer for harness racing. Hunting Park Course hosted the earliest races in Philadelphia.

On February 8, 1828, a group of Pennsylvanians met at Philadelphia's Indian Queen Tavern and founded the Hunting Park Association, one of the nation's earliest racing regulatory bodies. The Hunting Park Association held races to promote the breeding of quality horses.

During this period, Topgallant stood high among trotters, racing primarily at Hunting Park. Topgallant was among the first horses entered for the purse of the Hunting Park Association and competed in all of its early races. On May 15, 1828, he raced Screwdriver and Betsey Baker in three-mile heats for the Association's first purse and prize cup, which Screwdriver won. At the Hunting Park Course in 1829, Topgallant achieved a notable twelve-mile harness trot in 38 minutes.

On October 22, 1828, at the Hunting Park Course, Sally Miller and Lady Washington competed for the Association's "Colt Stake," a $50 prize and a silver cup. Sally Miller won the first and third heats (3:09, 3:04), while Lady Washington took the second (3:06).

In the 1830s, it was at Hunting Park Course that Hall of Fame driver Hiram Woodruff launched his harness racing career.

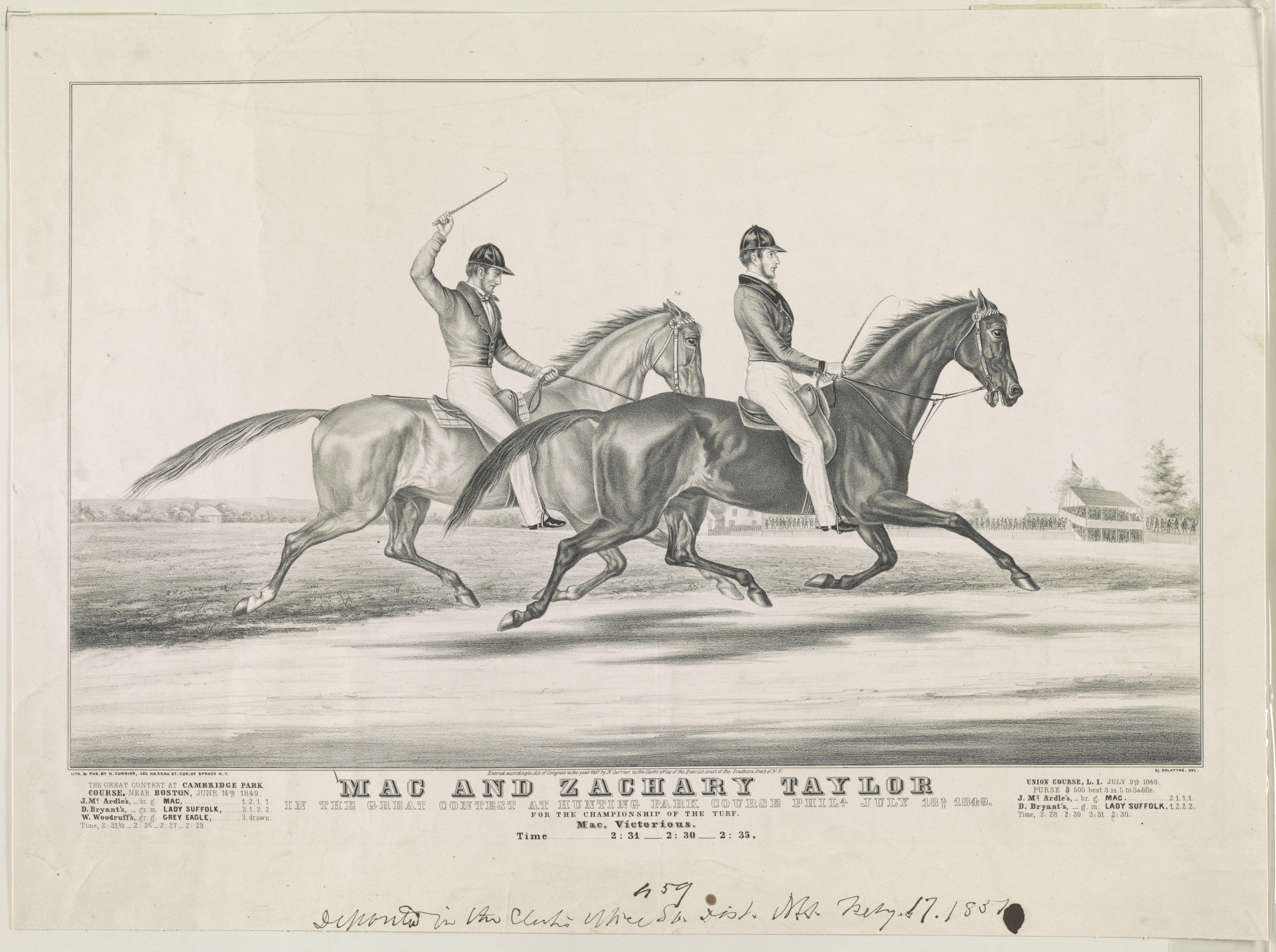
Mac and Zachary Taylor, Hunting Park Course, Philadelphia, July 18, 1849

The renowned racer Andrew Jackson set many world records at the course. Between 1832 and 1836, the trotting stallion competed regularly at Hunting Park.

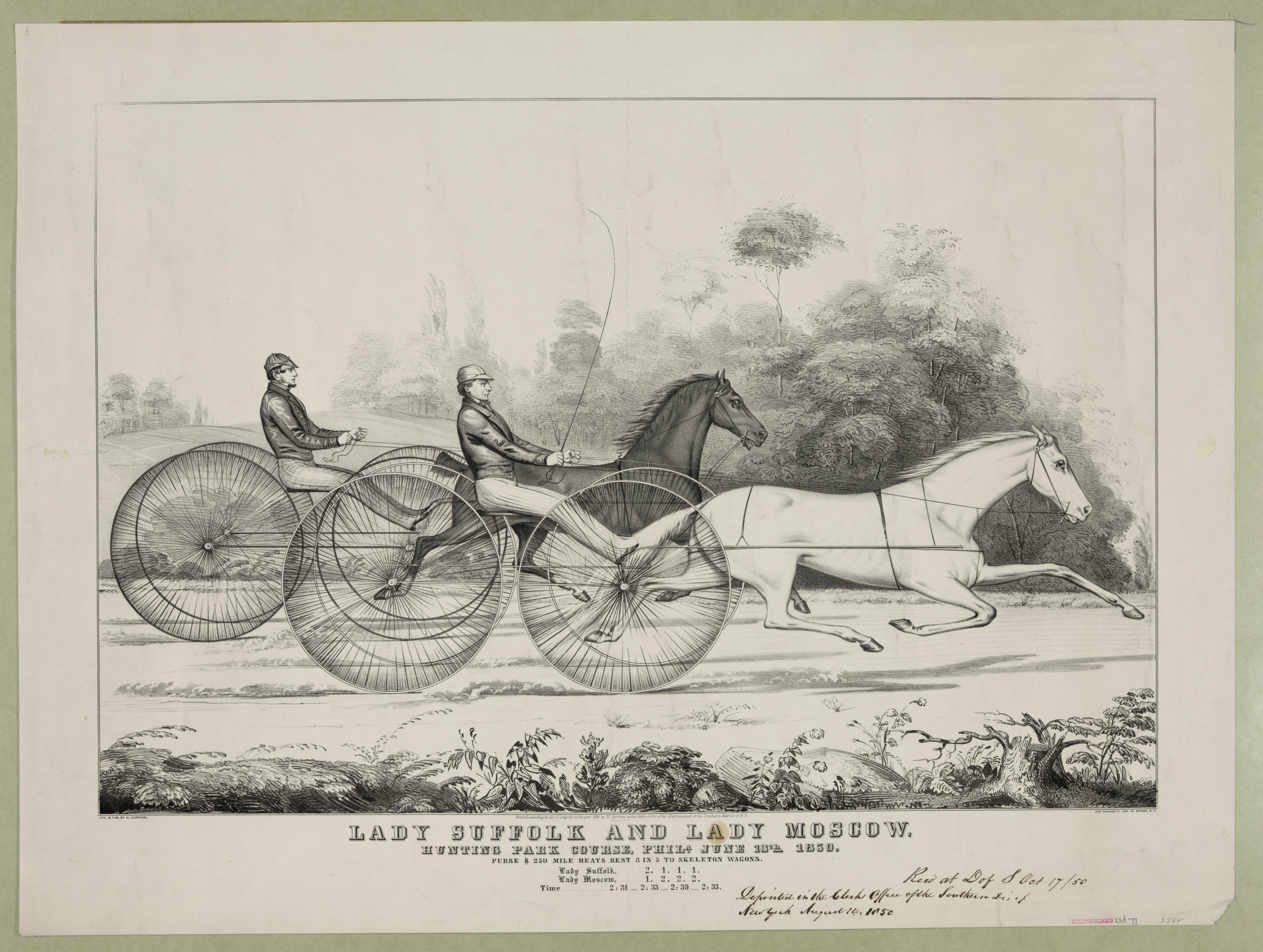
Lady Suffolk and Lady Moscow, Hunting Park Course, Philadelphia, June 13, 1850

On July 18, 1849, Mac won against Zachary Taylor at the Hunting Park Course in Philadelphia, clocking times of 2:31, 2:30, and 2:35. Nathaniel Currier of Currier & Ives produced a lithograph based on work by Henri Delattre.

At the Hunting Park Course on June 13, 1850, Lady Suffolk and Lady Moscow raced for $250. Nathaniel Currier produced another print capturing Lady Suffolk leading Lady Moscow in a harness race on the Nicetown Lane and Old York Road track.

The Hunting Park Course was the scene of a June 2, 1853 race, memorialized in a print, where the eight-year-old strawberry roan Tacony outpaced Mac.

Throughout the first half of the nineteenth century, Hunting Park was one of America's most renowned racecourses. The Hunting Park Course hosted Screwdriver's 2:40¾ saddle record in 1828, Topgallant's 2:39 under saddle in 1830, Sally Miller's 2:37 harness time in 1834, Edwin Forrest's 2:36½ harness record in 1838, and Tacony's 2:25½ saddle mark in 1853.

== Closure ==
Forty-five thousand dollars were raised by personal effort to buy the estate on Old York Road, paid on September 10, 1853, and conveyed to one subscriber. With the Act of Consolidation, 1854 plan in place, they waited for the legislature's approval. Philadelphia County was consolidated on February 2, 1854. On November 9, 1854, a proposal to dedicate the land of the Hunting Park Course as a public park was submitted. Pierce Butler chaired the donors' committee, and after meetings, a resolution for conveyance was approved by Mayor Robert T. Conrad on January 29, 1855. That year marked its establishment as one of Philadelphia's city parks, reflecting the shift from private racing grounds to public recreational use.

== See also ==
- List of horse racing venues
