= Senator Burr =

Senator Burr may refer to:

- Aaron Burr (1756–1836), Democratic-Republican U.S. Senator from New York from 1791 to 1797; later vice-president of the United States
- Carll S. Burr Jr. (1858–1936), Republican member of the New York State Senate
- Richard Burr (born 1955), Republican U.S. Senator from North Carolina from 2005 to 2023
