= Carll S. Burr Jr. =

American politician (1858–1936)

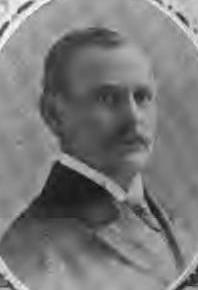
- Carll S. Burr Jr. (1897)

Member of the New York State Assembly
- In office 1896–1898
- Preceded by: Richard Higbie
- Succeeded by: Regis H. Post

Member of the New York State Senate
- In office 1905–1908
- Preceded by: Edwin Bailey Jr.
- Succeeded by: Orlando Hubbs

Personal details
- Born: September 26, 1858 Commack, New York, U.S.
- Died: January 2, 1936 (aged 77) Commack, New York, U.S.
- Party: Republican
- Relatives: Smith Burr (grandfather)
- Occupation: Horse breeder; politician
- Known for: Author of the 1906 Burr Act

Carll Smith Burr Jr. (September 26, 1858 – January 2, 1936) was an American politician.

== Early life ==
Carll Smith Burr Jr. was born on September 26, 1858, in Commack, New York.

He was the son of Carll S. Burr Sr. and grandson of famed horse breeder Smith Burr. Carll Jr. upheld the family legacy, gaining early recognition as a horse expert. Raised in Commack, he lived on his father's Indian Head stock farm on Burr Road.

He first attended the local one-room North School, then the Flushing Institute in Flushing, where his formal education concluded.

From a young age, he was recognized for his horsemanship, notably driving two neighbor mares to a double harness world record, lowering the mark by 1¾ seconds in front of 500 spectators. He went on to become his father's assistant and co-manager of the family enterprise. At the family estate, he maintained two race tracks and trained trotters for prominent Eastern harness racing figures, including Maud S., once the fastest trotter in the mile and owned by William Henry Vanderbilt. The Burr father-son team ran the Burr Equine Educational Institution for twenty-five years. He was appointed judge at the National Horse Show from 1892 to 1894 and again in 1901 and 1902, and at the New York State Fair in those same years.

== Political career ==
Carll S. Burr Jr. was a delegate to the 1892 Republican National Convention. In the 1896 presidential election, he was a presidential elector for William McKinley and Garret Hobart.

Burr was a member of the New York State Assembly (Suffolk Co., 2nd D.) in 1896, 1897, and 1898.

He was a member of the New York State Senate (1st D.) from 1905 to 1908, sitting in the 128th, 129th, 130th and 131st New York State Legislatures.

He authored the 1906 Burr Act, credited with safeguarding Suffolk County's water supply from being drained by New York City's expanding demands.

== Personal life ==
He married Hanie E. Carll, daughter of prominent shipbuilder Jesse Carll, in 1885. When he had his first son, he named him Carll S. Burr after himself and became Carll S. Burr II.

== Death ==
Carll S. Burr Jr. died on January 2, 1936, in Commack, Suffolk County, New York, United States, at age 77.

== See also ==
- Carll S. Burr Mansion
- Carll Burr Jr. House

New York State Assembly
Preceded by Richard Higbie all Suffolk County	New York State Assembly; Suffolk County, 2nd District; 1896–1898	Succeeded by Regis H. Post
New York State Senate
Preceded by Edwin Bailey Jr.	New York State Senate; 1st District; 1905–1908	Succeeded by Orlando Hubbs
