= Topgallant =

Topgallant may refer to:

- Topgallant sail
- Topgallant mast
- Topgallant Islands, an island group in South Australia
- Topgallant (horse)
