= Marestail =

Marestail (also mare's tail and mare's-tail) may refer to:

== Plants ==
- Conyza canadensis, an annual weed also known as horseweed and Canadian fleabane
- Equisetum, a fern ally also known as horsetail and pipeweed
- Hippuris, a genus of aquatic flowering plants, including:
  - Hippuris vulgaris, the common mare's-tail

== Other ==
- Mare's tail, a type of cirrus cloud formation

== See also ==
- Grey Mare's Tail (disambiguation)
