= Topgallant (horse) =

American-bred Standardbred racehorse

Old Topgallant
- Breed: Standardbred
- Sire: Coriander
- Grandsire: Messenger
- Damsire: Messenger
- Sex: Gelding
- Foaled: 1807
- Died: 1835
- Country: United States
- Colour: Bay
- Trainer: George Woodruff

Topgallant (1807 – 1835), also known as Old Top, was an American trotting horse.

== Origin and early years ==
In 1807, Topgallant was foaled. He was sired by Coriander, a son of Messenger out of a daughter of Bishop's Hambletonian, also by Messenger, the imported English Thoroughbred. Topgallant's second dam was sired by Rainbow, son of imported Wildair, meaning he shared the same maternal grandmother as the famed mare Lady Suffolk.

Bred on Long Island, the dark bay gelding worked as a farm horse until age fourteen, when his unexpected trotting speed led to his sale to a Philadelphia man who trained him for racing.

Part of George Woodruff's renowned stable, Topgallant was trained and ridden by him at the Hunting Park Course. As a boy, George's nephew Hiram Woodruff looked after Topgallant, later becoming his trainer, rider, and driver. Woodruff described Topgallant as "a dark bay horse, 15 hands 3 inches high, plain and raw-boned, but with rather a fine head and neck, and an eye expressive of much courage. He was spavined in both hind legs, and his tail was slim at the root. His spirit was very high, and yet he was so reliable that he would hardly ever break, and his bottom was of the finest and toughest quality. He was more than fourteen years of age before he was known at all as a trotter, except that he could go a distance, the entire length of the New York Road, as well as any horse that had ever been extended on it."

== Racing career ==
Matched against Betsy Baker in 1824, Topgallant won a three-mile harness race in 8:42, finishing 40 yards ahead. In one outing, he trotted twelve miles along the road in 39 minutes.

His standout feats at his home track, Allen's Race Course (later Hunting Park Course), built a strong reputation, and in 1828, the Hunting Park Association barred him from entering a second race, judging him a first-rate horse. On May 15, 1828, Topgallant raced in three-mile heat races against Screwdriver and Betsy Baker for the Hunting Park Association's first purse and prize cup, with Screwdriver winning.

At twenty-two years old, in 1829, Topgallant won a race against Whalebone at Philadelphia's Hunting Park Course. The horse trotted four heats of four miles each in 11:16, 11:06, 11:17, and 12:15, the whole sixteen miles being trotted in 45:44. Topgallant won the race, having secured two heats to Whalebone's one; one being a dead heat.

On June 23, 1830, at Hunting Park Course, Topgallant beat Columbus in two 2-mile heats.

At Hunting Park in 1831, 24-year-old Topgallant, ridden by George Woodruff, competed in three-mile heats against Whalebone, Dread, Collector, Lady Jackson, Moonshine, and Columbus. Topgallant captured the second heat in a series where Collector won the first and Dread the third. Although he led the fourth heat for two miles, Dread overtook him to win. Topgallant bounced back the next week, defeating Whalebone in a three-mile race in Baltimore, Maryland. Topgallant, with George Woodruff aboard, raced Whalebone and George Spicer for a $300 prize.

The early American trotter lived to be twenty-eight and remained fast until the end.

== Death ==
Topgallant died around 1835, at age 28.

== Legacy ==
Topgallant spent many seasons near the top of the American trotting turf despite frequent defeats and relatively slow times. He was the first to make a record time of 2:40. His popularity rivaled that of Lady Suffolk and Flora Temple, earning him the affectionate nickname "Old Top" from horse racing fans who supported him regardless of his record. Hiram Woodruff wrote in Trotting Horse of America that old Topgallant was "one of the most remarkable trotting horses that this or any other country ever produced."

== See also ==
- List of racehorses
