= Grey Mare's Tail =

Grey Mare's Tail or Greymare's Tail is the name of several waterfalls:

== Scotland ==
- Grey Mare's Tail, Galloway
- Grey Mare's Tail, Kilpatrick Hills
- Grey Mare's Tail, Kinlochmore
- Greymare's Tail, Kirkconnel
- Grey Mare's Tail, Moffat Hills
- Grey Mare's Tail, Monreith

== Wales ==
- Grey Mare's Tail, Conwy

== See also ==
- Marestail (disambiguation)
