= Marion Carll Farm =

Historic house in New York, United States

- Marion Carll Property
- U.S. National Register of Historic Places
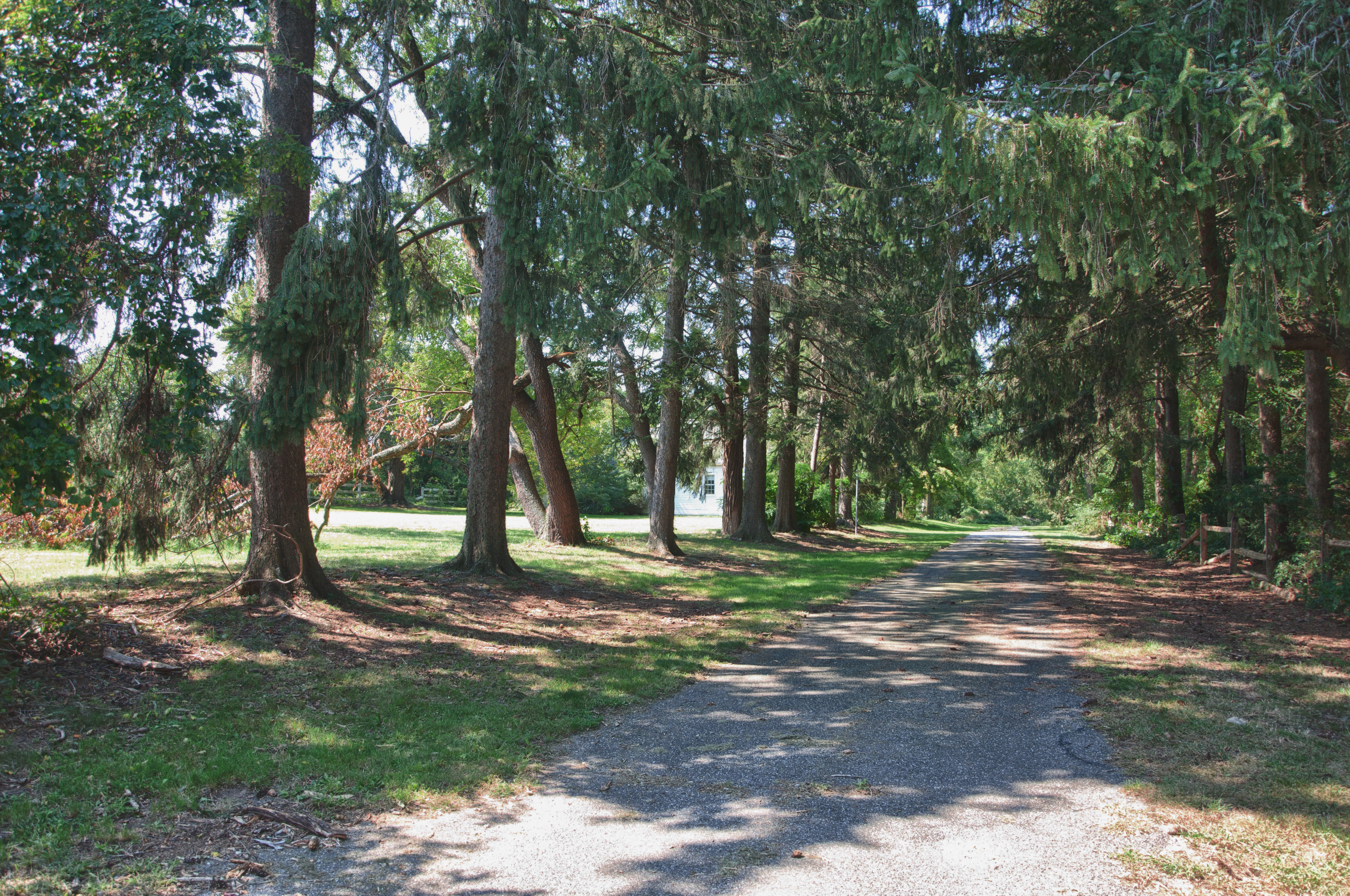

- Location within New York Location within the United States
- Location: 475 Commack Rd., Commack, New York
- Coordinates: 40°49′33″N 73°17′44″W
- Area: 9.3 acres (3.8 ha)
- Built: ca. 1860 Farm date back to 1701
- Architect: Carll, John
- Architectural style: Italianate, Federal
- NRHP reference No.: 79001632
- Added to NRHP: June 26, 1979

Marion Carll Farm is a historic home and property located in Commack, Suffolk County, New York. It consists of the 1860 farmhouse, privy, garage, smokehouse, milk house, horse barn/carriage house, sheep barn, and four smaller barns. It was added to the National Register of Historic Places in 1979.

Marion Carll was a schoolteacher who moved onto the property in 1885. She also served as Commack's District's Treasurer and Census Taker.

When Marion Carll died in 1968, she willed to the Commack School District to be used as a historical museum for educational purposes. However, the property was not maintained and fell into disrepair. In 2012, several of Carll's heirs filed a lawsuit to have the farm returned to them due to the lack of maintenance and state of disrepair of the property. However, this lawsuit was dismissed in 2017.

In 2019, the Commack School District announced that they would be leasing part of the farm to Long Island University for a veterinary school and that it would be using the funding from the lease to restore the farm. Despite this announcement, some local activists remain unconvinced that enough funding will be raised to be able to accomplish a proper restoration. Long Island University signed a 10-year lease and intends to raise grazing animals on 6 acres of the property for students to practice clinical skills on.
