= Commack Methodist Church and Cemetery =

Historic site in Suffolk County, New York

- Commack United Methodist Church and Cemetery
- U.S. National Register of Historic Places
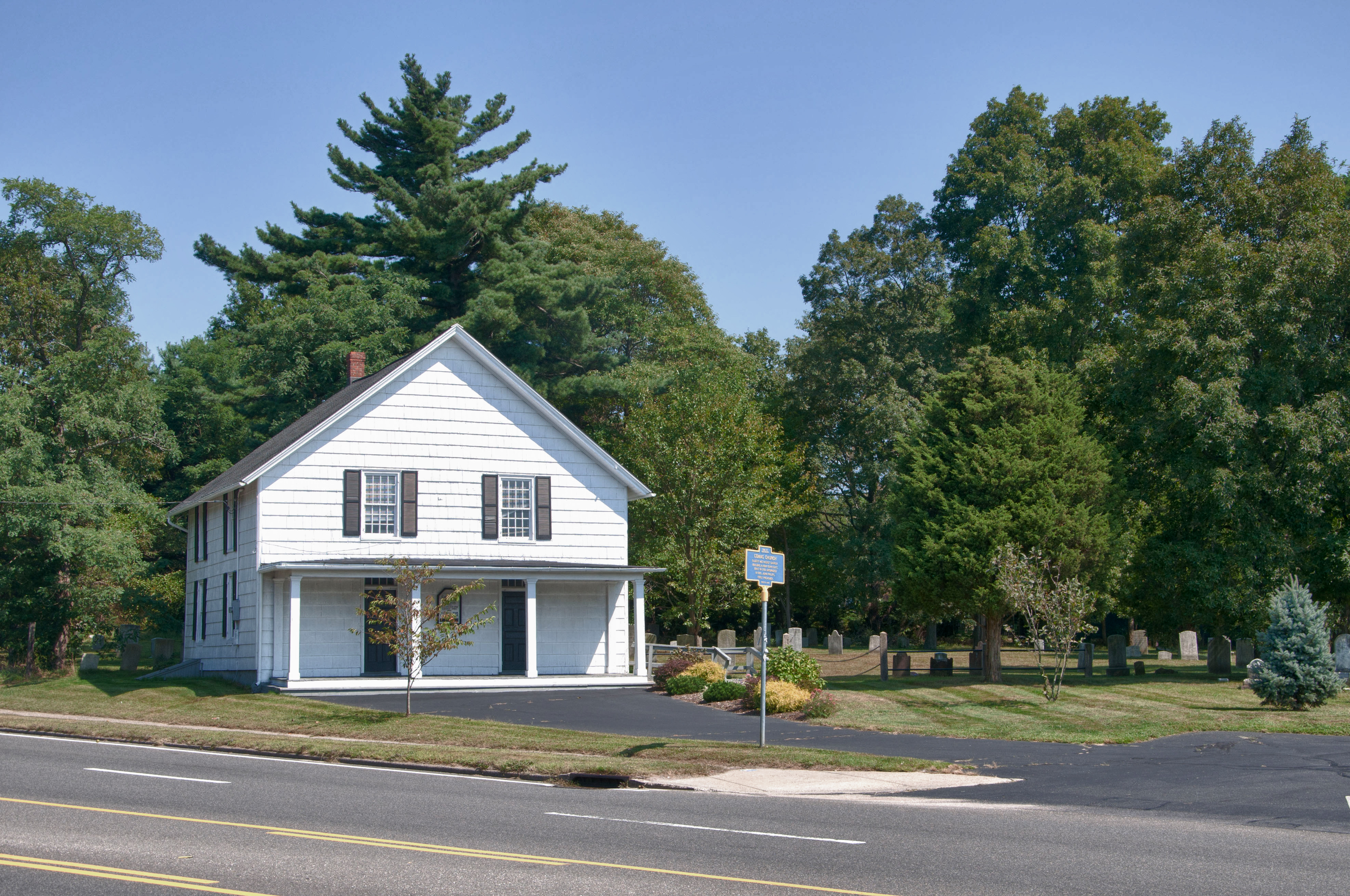

- Location within New York Location within the United States
- Location: 486 Townline Rd., Commack, New York
- Coordinates: 40°50′41″N 73°17′36″W
- Area: 8.5 acres (3.4 ha)
- Built: 1789
- Architect: Hubbs, James
- MPS: Huntington Town MRA
- NRHP reference No.: 85002511
- Added to NRHP: September 26, 1985

Commack United Methodist Church and Cemetery is a historic Methodist church meeting house and cemetery located at 486 Townline Road in Commack, Suffolk County, New York. It was built in 1789 and is a relatively large, two story, two bay shingled building with a broad, overhanging gable roof. It is the oldest Methodist church in New York State in continuous operation. The surrounding burial ground has graves dating to the 18th century.

Methodism in Winne-Comac began in 1783 when a society was formed after a sermon preached by John Phillips, a Methodist local preacher and a tailor in the British army during the Revolutionary War. James Hubbs had heard him in Cow Harbor (now Northport) and invited him to preach in his home. The first conference preacher, Phillip Cox, was appointed to Newton and Comac the following year, holding services in homes, with a total of two dozen members, half of them Negro slaves. In 1785 Ezekiel Cooper was appointed to the Long Island Circuit of which Comac was a part.

The Comac Society was the second to be formed on Long Island, preceded only by Newton in 1768. However, the historic building we now call our 1789 Chapel, has the distinction of being the oldest Methodist Church in continuous use in New York in which people still worship in the original building, with but few alterations. For it was in 1789 during the pastorate of William Phoebus that James Hubbs and the community erected "a neat, substantial and commodious house of worship." Others active in the society at that time were Nehemiah Brush, Jacob Wheeler, Charles Peters, Joel Rogers and Jacob Hoff. The land was purchased from Von Hadah Robbins for two pounds five shillings. Featured were a high box pulpit, one center door, and one balcony stairs. Foot warmers were brought by worshippers in the cold winters.

In 1791 Harry Hosier, known as Black Harry, preached at the invitation of Jacob Brush, while traveling with Bishop Francis Asbury; and in 1796, Freeborn Garretson was Presiding Elder. In 1803, a group from Winne-Comac with Freeborn Garretson, established a class at the home of Joseph Higby, Little Harbor, later called Centerport, while Sylvester was pastor.

In 1806, Mitchell B. Bull and James Cleman, joint preachers of the Long Island Circuit, each preached only 15 times at Comac because of the size of their circuit. In 1810, Comac became part of the Suffolk County Circuit along with Happauge and Sag Harbor, with joint preachers Henry Redstone and Coles Carpenter.

A hand written summary of early Quarterly Conferences (1/4", with writer's shorthand) with only the name "Chris Hawkes, 1895" located in the Huntington Historical Society Library, provided interesting sidelights of an 1815 meeting: "On Sunday a.m. services started at 8 or 9 o'clock with a Love Feast. On these important occasions the membership of all the surrounding country came together, and we were given tickets of admission to the communion services by the class leaders. No one could enter these sacred services otherwise, nor those who wore rings on fingers or ears, nor flowers or hats." The circuit riders traveled some 250 miles each month to cover their circuit. Until 1869, a different preacher was assigned to Comac each year, including 1833 when the Smithtown circuit was formed and J. Lovejoy was the assigned preacher. In 1830 services were held every two weeks in Comac.

In 1835–36, the building was remodeled during the tenure of John B. Merwin. The roof was shingled; a chimney was built for a stove with accompanying monstrous pipes across the building; the twelve foot high pulpit was remodeled and lowered two feet; the communion rail was made semicircular; the floor was raised where needed to make it level; and two panel entrance doors were built replacing the single one, with two flights of stairs to the balcony. Men entered and sat on the left side, women on the right.

In 1859 the pulpit was again lowered during some remodeling while Eben S. Hibbard was pastor. A letter from W.A. Layton, pastor 1880–82 to Mrs. M. E. Shea, dated May 1, 1934, stated that during his pastorate the church still had the high pulpit, and he remembered performing the wedding ceremony for Mr. & Mrs. Fred Goldsmith, Senior, while Rev. Wardell was District Superintendent. He further stated that he "never spent a happier pastorate than the one he spent on the Smithtown Circuit."

In 1883 the pulpit was lowered to its present height for the 100th anniversary of the society. In 1889, a parsonage was built as part of the celebration of the 100th anniversary, during pastorate of William Dalziel, and a barn and sheds were built in 1895.

"Let there be light!" Between 1921 and 1923, electricity was wired into the church. There was none in Comac until after 1918, since Brindley Field in Comac was responsible for bringing it for its own use during World War I, and it became available to homes, stores, and the Church.

Also in 1923 new song books were purchased, and a gold lettered church sign was erected. In 1925 or 1926, the basement was dug out for the first time to install a furnace for comfortable warmth, and finally to get rid of the monstrous pipes overhead.

In 1939, in preparation for the 150th anniversary, the building was painted, landscaping of church grounds was improved, a circular driveway with Belgian blocks and a border were made, continuing along the sidewalk as a WPA project. The sign "Commack Methodist Church. The oldest Methodist Church edifice..." was erected and the World War I Honor Roll sign moved closer to the street on west side of building and a field was cleaned for parking area. Bishop Francis J. Mc Connel preached at the Sunday, October 1 evening service, with 125 attending, 54 guests registered, and an offering of $21.50.

Tuesday night was "Old Pastor's Night," with greetings by many former pastors and a brief historical sketch by Rev. William C. Craig, with 120 attending, and an offering of $24.25.

Thursday night was "Interdenominational Night," with greetings from many churches; hymn singing led by Dr. Richard L. Francis; and a history of the church given by Mrs. E. Shea, mother of Henry Shea; and greetings from Rev. J. Percival Huget, president of Suffolk County Council of Churches. The attendance was 230, and the offering, $30.50.

The Old Home Jubilee Meeting was held Sunday, October 8 at 3 p.m.. with song service again led by Dr. Francis. A group photo taken in front of the building included some 125 of the 185 present. The address was given by Albert E. Beebe, superintendent of the Brooklyn North District. Attendance was 185 and offering, $34.25. Charles S. Gray was Pastor.

In 1952 remodeling included a new roof, new foundation, heating system, and some replacement floor beams, during the pastorate of R.R. Roberts, who also wrote a history of Methodism in Commack.

In 1957 because of increasing attendance, the first section of the Religious Education Building was completed at a cost of $60,000, and rented for three years for weekday use to the Commack Public Schools. In 1961, at a time of burgeoning population growth in Commack, a second unit was added at a cost of $70,000, and used by Suffolk County BOCES until 1973. During this period, Sunday School enrollment was over 200. Austin Armitstead was pastor in 1957, and Max Mobley in 1961. The appearance of the altar area was enhanced by additions of a reredos similar to that of historic St. George Church in Philadelphia.

In 1964 the 175th anniversary of the building was celebrated with a series of special Sunday services from September 20 – October 11, with guest speakers Rev. Harrison Davis, District Superintendent; Bishop Lloyd C. Wicke; Bishop Frederick B. Newell; Dr. Ross Linger, former pastor; and Dr. Henry Whyman, Executive Secretary of the New York Society. A gala dinner was held at the Huntington Town House. Mortgage was paid on the Religious Education building, and a vote was taken to purchase land for a new Sanctuary and Fellowship Hall.

The new sanctuary was dedicated in 1968, and the older building became known as the "1789 Chapel." It is still used for worship on the Sunday before July 4, and for Christmas Eve services, as well as by the Long Island Korean United Methodist Church.

A cemetery with graves dating from 1791 is adjacent to the chapel.

It was added to the National Register of Historic Places in 1985.
