= Lady Suffolk =

American-bred Standardbred racehorse

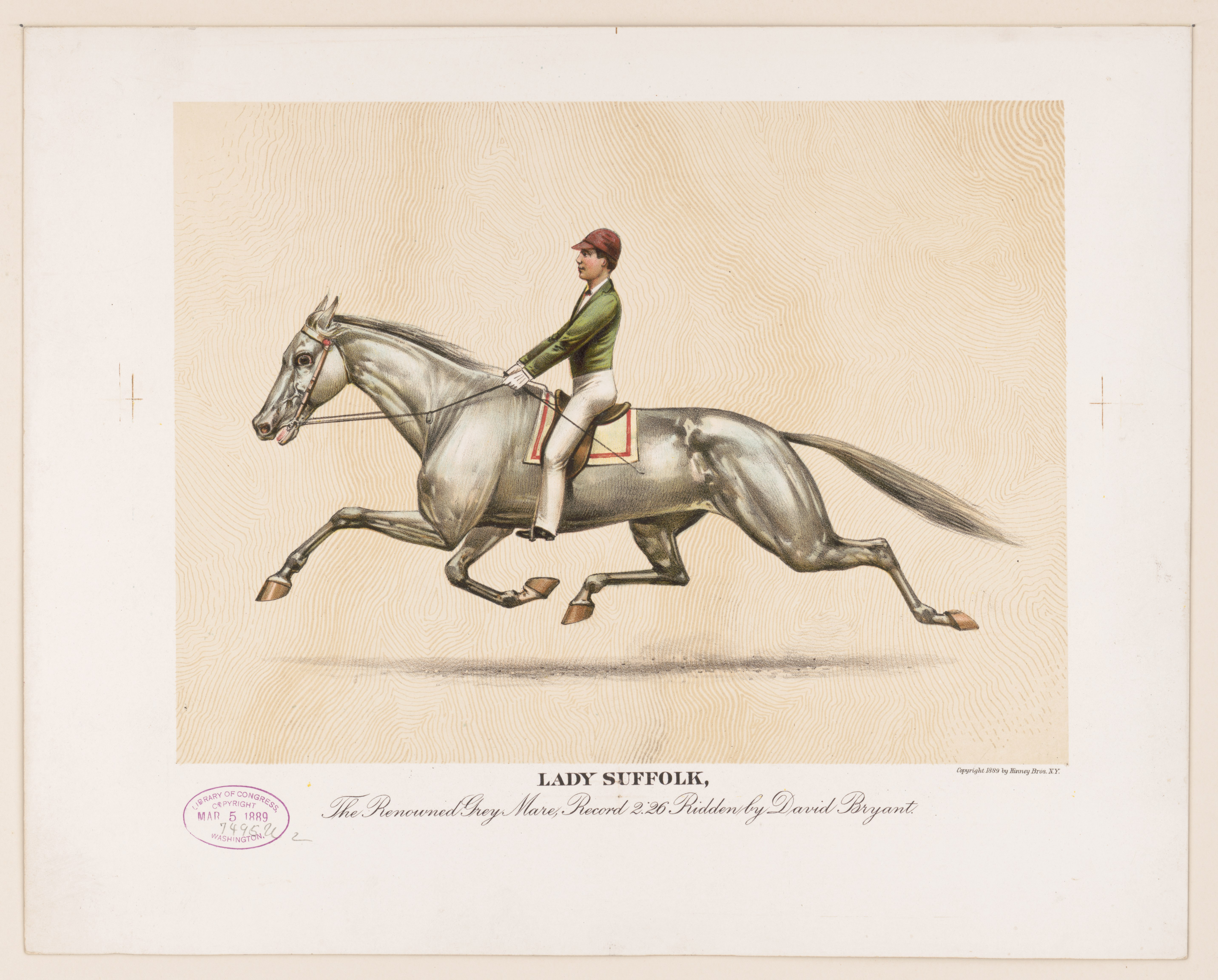
- Breed: Standardbred
- Sire: Engineer II
- Grandsire: Engineer
- Dam: Jenny
- Sex: Mare
- Foaled: 1833
- Died: March 7, 1855
- Country: United States
- Colour: Gray
- Breeder: Smith Burr
- Owner: David Bryan (1835-1851); Shaw & White (1851-1853); David Hill (1853-1855)
- Record: t,2:29½

Honours
- U.S. Harness Racing Hall of Fame (1967)

Lady Suffolk (1833 – 1855), also known as the Old Gray Mare, was an American trotting horse, noted for racing both under saddle and to sulky.

== Origin and early years ==
Lady Suffolk was bred on the old homestead of Smith Burr (grandfather of Carll S. Burr Jr.), in Smithtown, New York. Smith Burr owned Lady Suffolk's sire.

Foaled in 1833, she was sired by Engineer II, a son of Engineer, descending from the famous thoroughbred Messenger, who founded the Standardbred breed. Her dam was General John Floyd's Jenny, a brown mare.

First sold for $60 as a weanling, she was later bought at age two by Smithtown butcher Richard F. Blydenburgh for $90 and used to haul a meat wagon. While delivering oysters from the Great South Bay, a livery stable owner approached the butcher about purchasing the workhorse. David Bryan purchased the four-year old filly, which had been pulling an oyster cart. The deal closed at $112.50. Once David Bryan acquired Lady Suffolk in 1835, he remained her owner until 1851. She first attracted attention as a trotter while working as a livery stable mare. William T. Porter, editor of the Spirit of the Times, saw her potential and persuaded David Bryan to enter her in races.

== Racing career ==
Under her new owner, she was entered in her first race at Babylon, Long Island, in February 1838, competing for an $11 purse. Lady Suffolk, under saddle, won two out of three heats. Following Porter's advice, she was entered in a race at the Beacon Course on Weehawken Heights in June 1838. She then became the country's most active and successful trotter, racing nearly year-round and defeating most of her notable rivals. The horse traveled through seventeen states, pulling her racing gear, driver, and owner from one venue to the next.

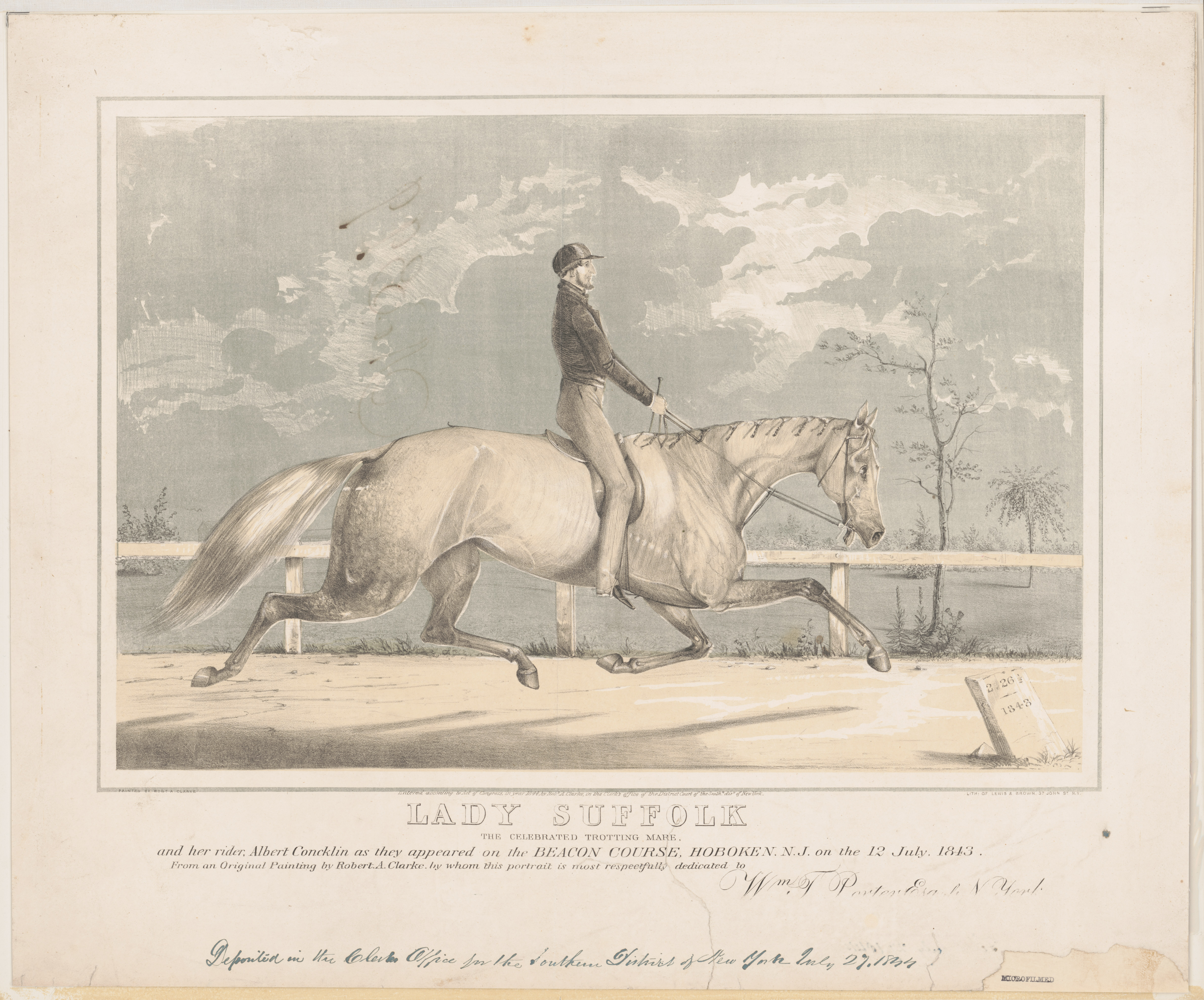
Lady Suffolk, Beacon Course, Hoboken, New Jersey, Robert A. Clarke, July 12, 1843

Lady Suffolk became the first trotter to break 2:30 on July 12, 1843, running a 2:26½ mile with Albert Conklin. The feat cut nearly five seconds off the 1834 record and earned her the nickname "Queen of the Turf," helped by William T. Porter's reporting in The Spirit of the Times.

The racing mare held records under saddle, to wagon, and in the high-wheel sulky. Lady Suffolk made history on October 13, 1845, at Hoboken, New Jersey, with the first sub-2:30 mile in harness. The twelve-year-old trotted the second heat of a five-heat race in 2:29½.

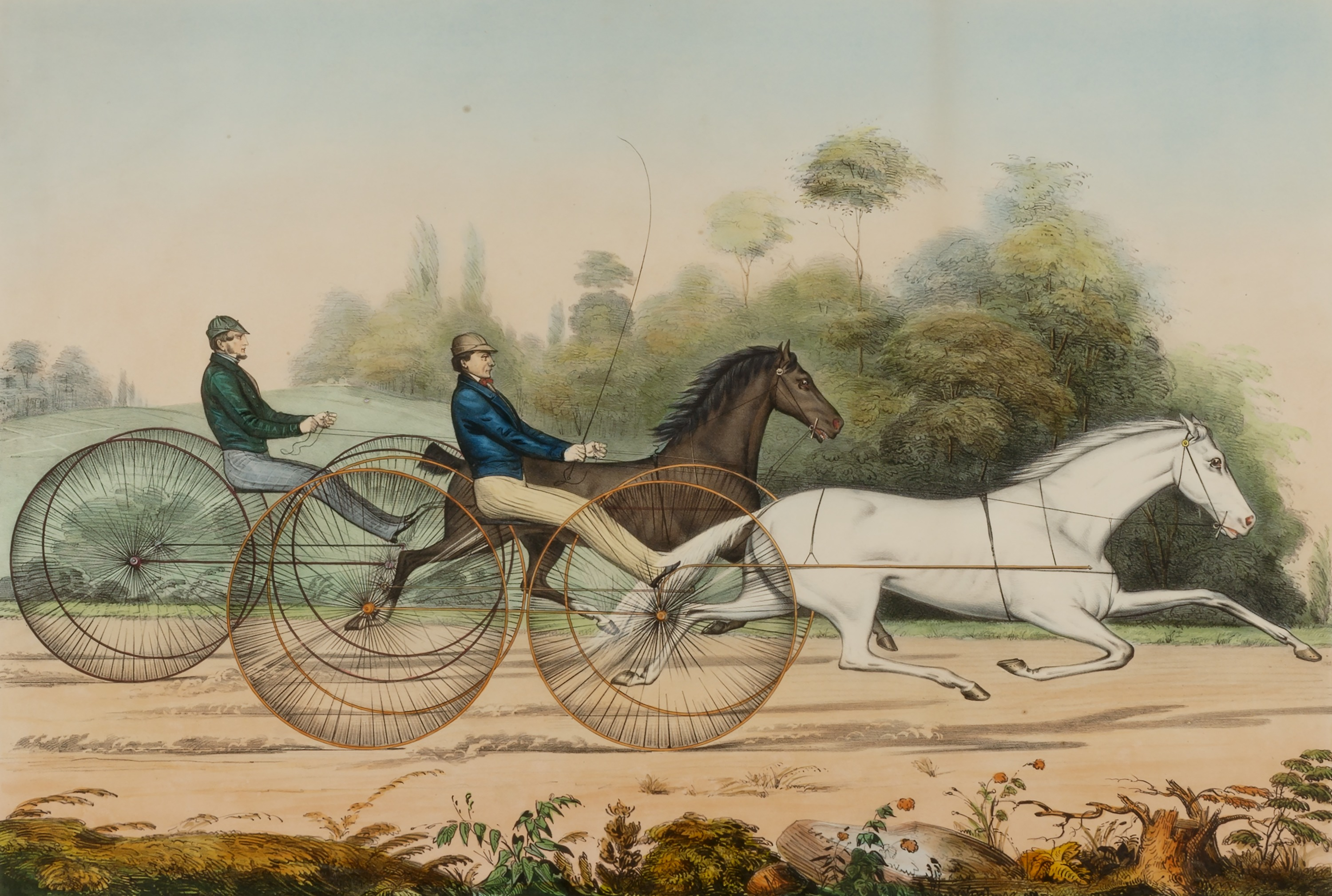
Lady Suffolk and Lady Moscow, Currier & Ives, 1850

Lady Suffolk, then 14, won Saratoga Springs' first official horse race in July 1847, after a long trip from Long Island. Driven by David Bryan in a crude four-wheeled sulky, she raced Moscow, owned by Gen. Dunham and driven by James Whelpley in a two-wheeled cart. Suffolk, though not in peak form, won the first two heats in 2:52 and 2:54. Moscow came up lame, prompting Dunham to withdraw, but Whelpley objected, and the race continued. Suffolk edged the final heat in 2:44. Lady Suffolk secured Saratoga's first recorded victory. That summer featured four more race days, including a rematch with Moscow, which she won again. Lady Suffolk injured her ankle at Saratoga in 1849 and was nearly put down, but she recovered and raced until the age of 20.

Lady Suffolk, age 18, faced Lady Moscow on May 21, 1849, at Union Course in Long Island for a $300 purse. Driven by David Bryan in a light sulky, she won the five one-mile heats over Lady Moscow, driven by Mr. Case.

Lady Suffolk's career slowed in its last six years, with only seven races, due to the growing shift toward harness racing.

In 1850, Bryan raced Lady Suffolk in a series of races, ending in New Orleans, where he became ill and died on April 5, 1851. C. S. Ellis, of the Metairie Race Course, cared for the mare, returning her to Mrs. Bryan after a campaign from Mobile to New York. At age 20, she was purchased by Shaw & White of the Union Course. Her last race was at Middlebury, Vermont, in 1854, under Mr. White's ownership.

== Breeding ==
Following her retirement from racing, she was acquired by David Hill of Vermont to be bred to his Black Hawk 20. In spring 1854, at age 21, she lost a foal by him, and months later died unexpectedly in her stable.

== Death ==
Lady Suffolk died on March 17, 1855, in Bridport, Vermont, United States, at age 22.

== Legacy ==
Lady Suffolk raced 163 times from 1838 to 1854, securing 90 wins, 56 second-place finishes, six third-place finishes, and more than $35,000 in purses. She was the first trotting horse that ever made a record of 2:30 or better.

Lady Suffolk was the subject of many lithographs, as well as paintings by George Ford Morris and Theodore Marsden. The song The Old Gray Mare by Stephen Foster is said to have been inspired by Lady Suffolk.

Lady Suffolk remained a public attraction even after death. Her skin was tanned and mounted by a taxidermist, then displayed for years in the window of a harness maker's shop on upper Broadway in New York City.

Roosevelt Raceway in Westbury introduced the "Lady Suffolk Trot" in 1959, with a purse exceeding $35,000.

She was inducted into the "Immortals" category of the U.S. Harness Racing Hall of Fame in 1967.

== Gallery ==
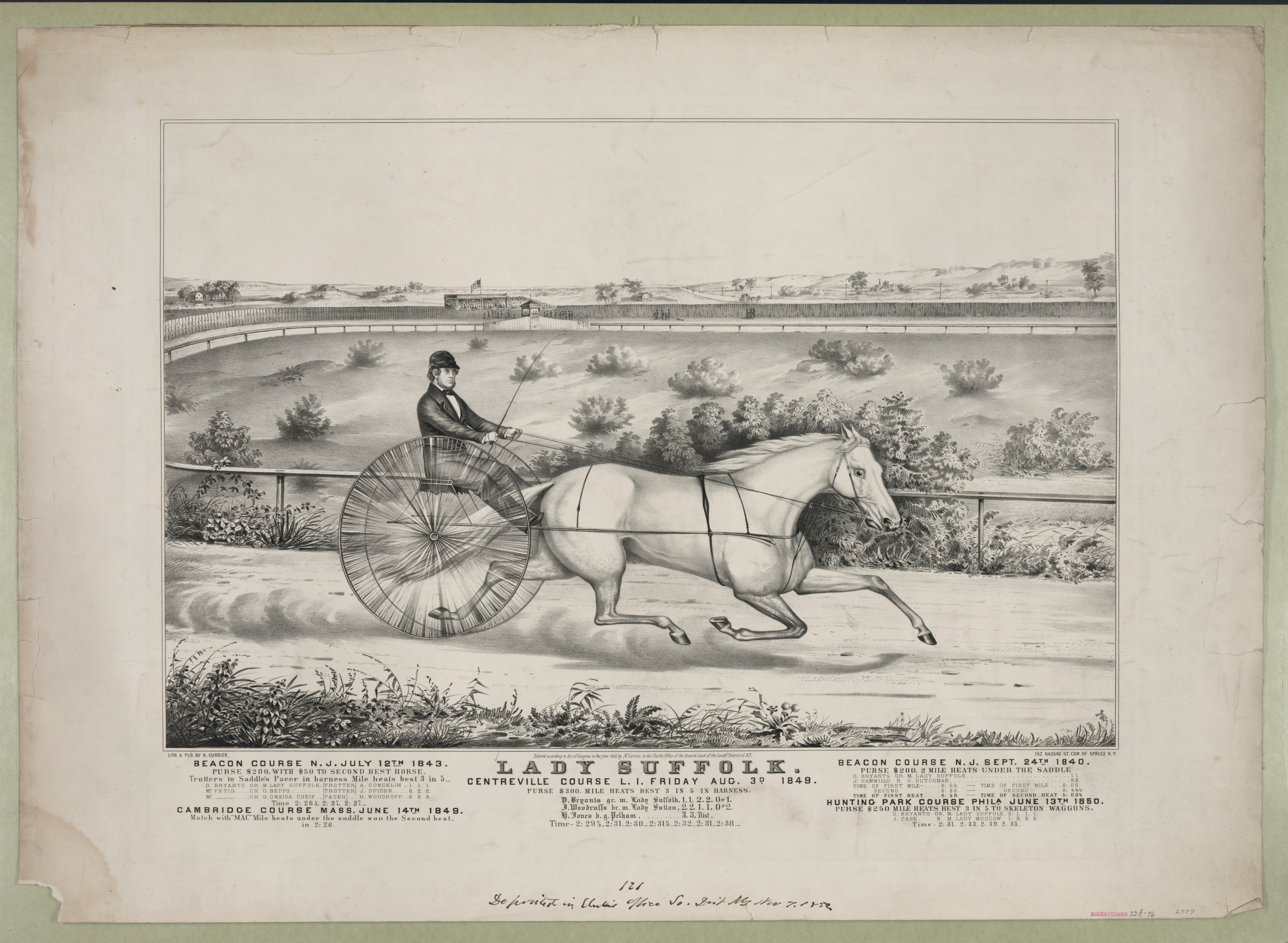
Lady Suffolk, Centreville Course, Long Island, Nathaniel Currier, August 3, 1849

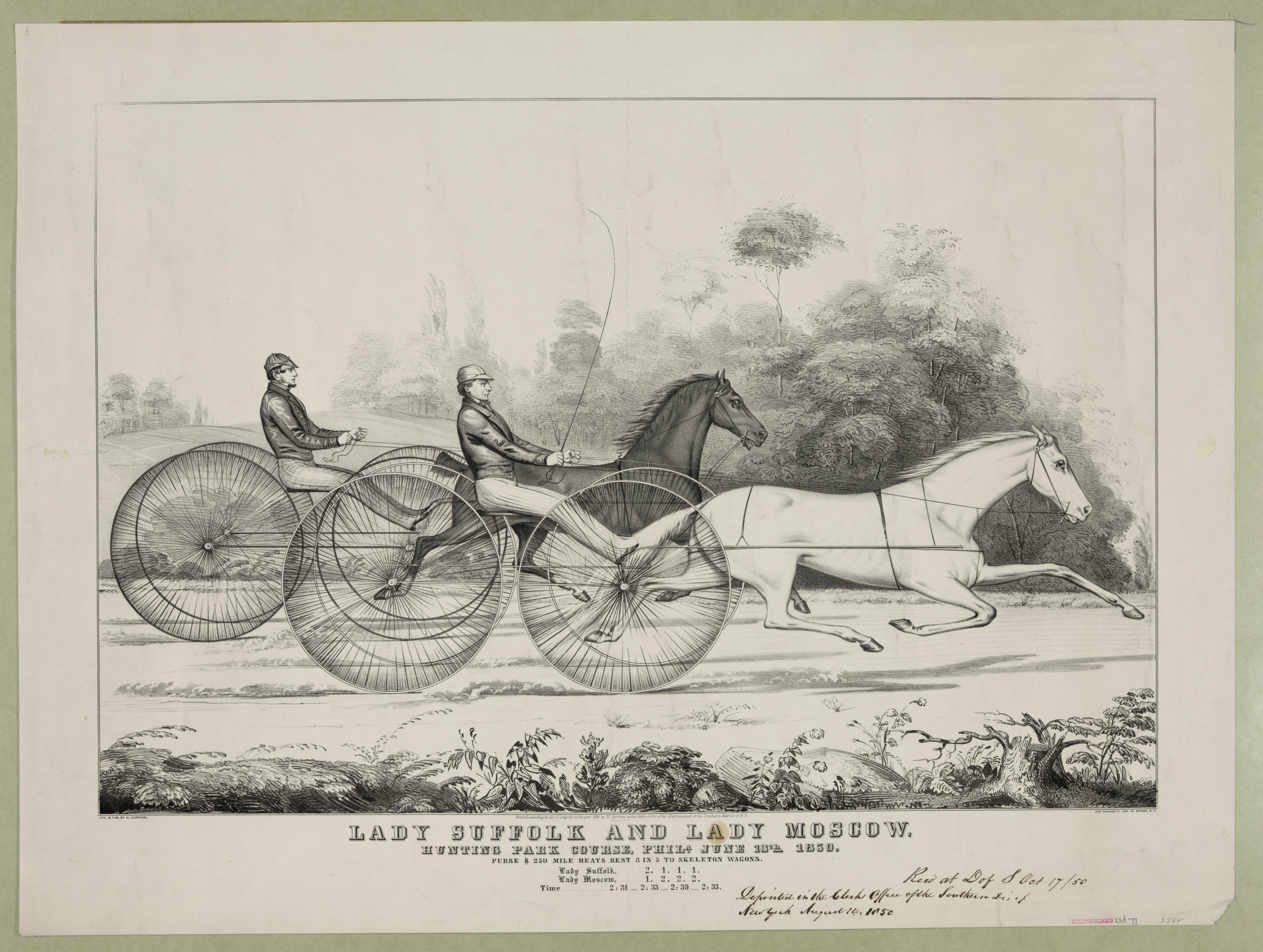
Lady Suffolk and Lady Moscow, Hunting Park Course, Nathaniel Currier, June 13, 1850

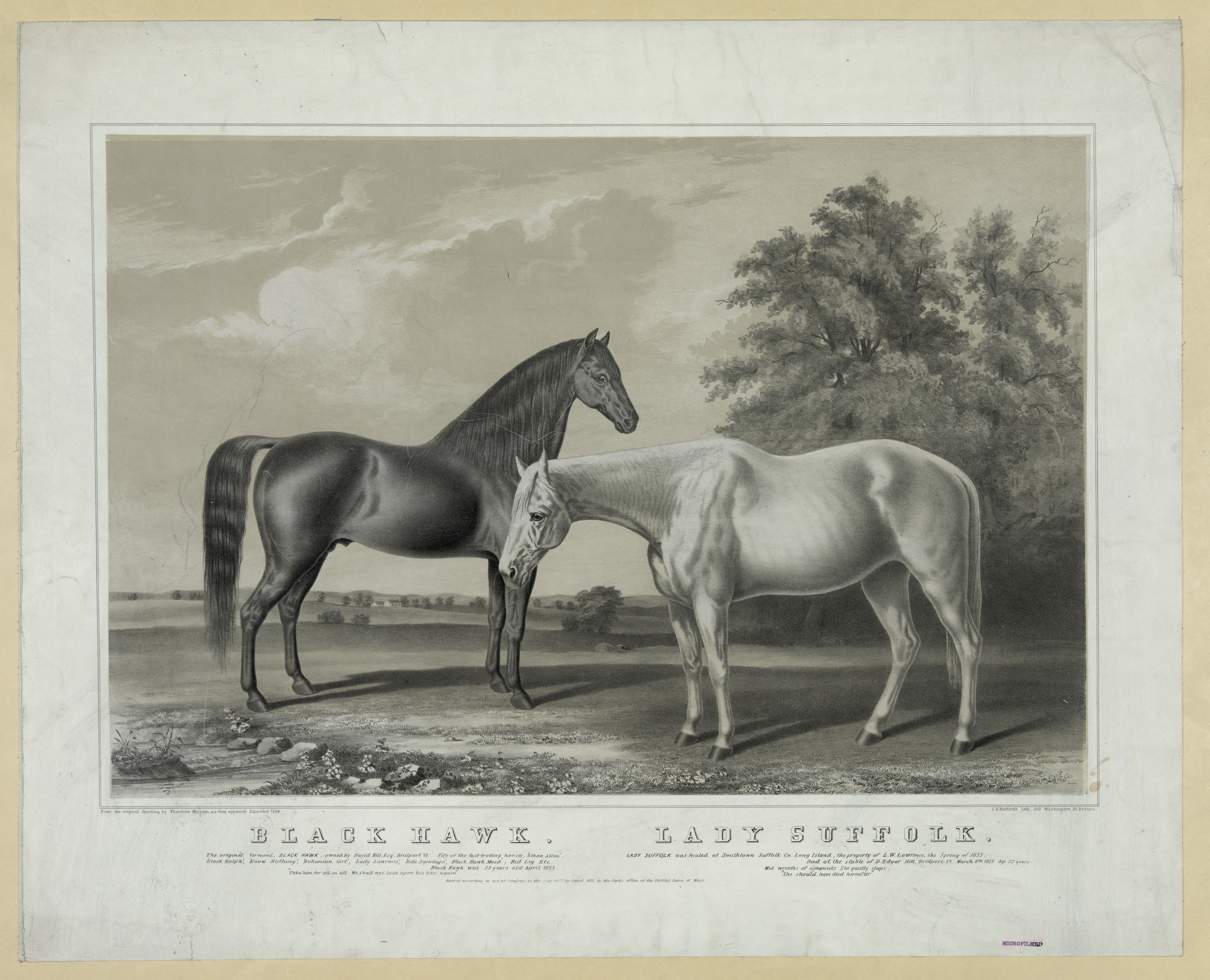
Black Hawk & Lady Suffolk, J.H. Bufford, 1855

== See also ==
- List of racehorses
