= Carll Burr Jr. House =

Historic house in New York, United States

- U.S. National Register of Historic Places
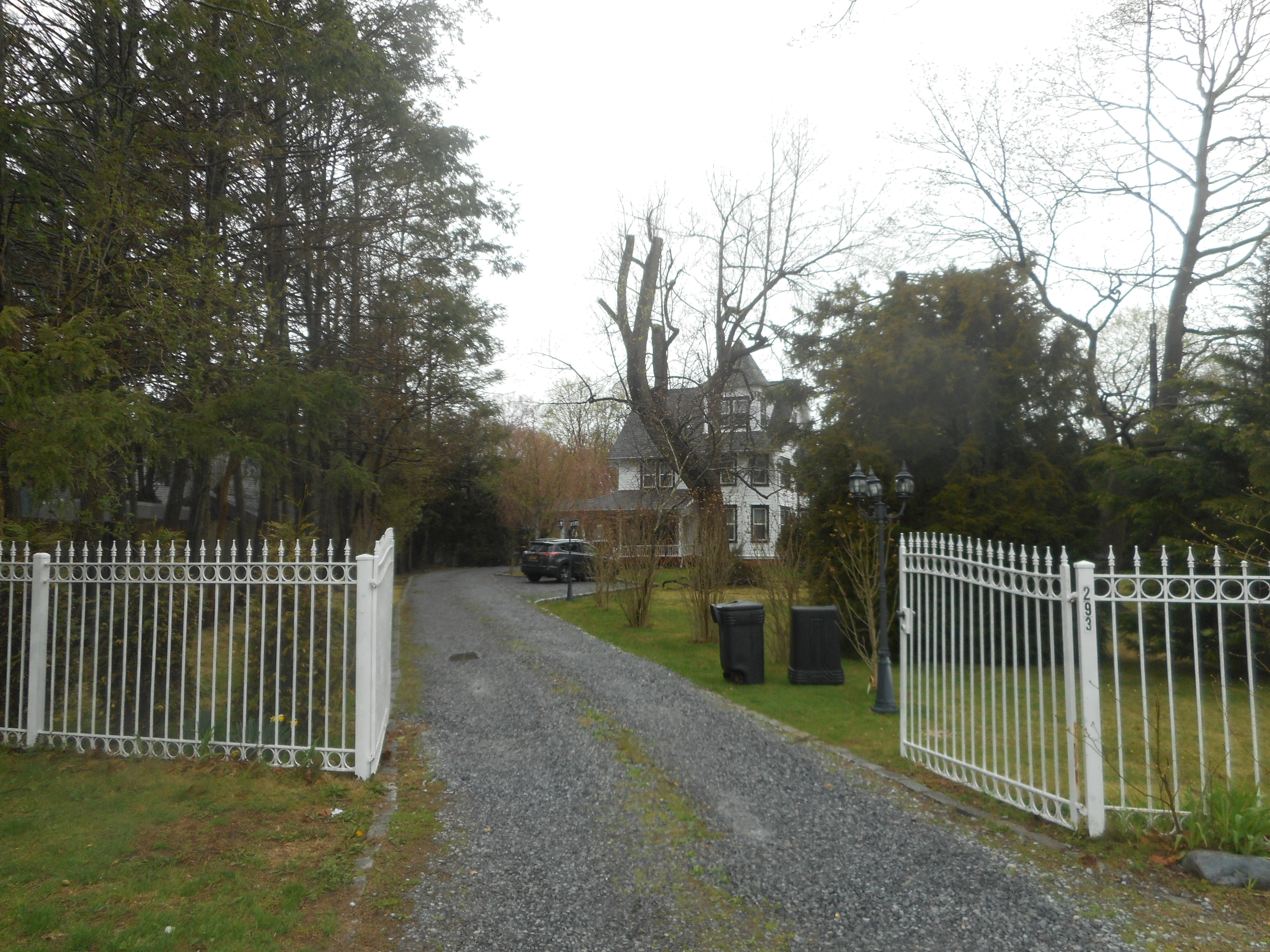
- White wrought-iron gated driveway to the house.

- Location within New York Location within the United States
- Location: 293 Burr Rd., Commack, New York
- Coordinates: 40°51′4″N 73°18′6″W
- Area: 4 acres (1.6 ha)
- Built: 1895
- Architectural style: Late Victorian, Eclectic
- MPS: Huntington Town MRA
- NRHP reference No.: 85002503
- Added to NRHP: September 26, 1985

Carll Burr Jr. House is a historic home located at Commack in Suffolk County, New York. It is a 2 1/2-story, shingle and clapboard residence with a sweeping gable roof. It was built about 1895 and features a 3-story, three-bay tower with a tent roof. Also on the property is a contributing shed.

It was added to the National Register of Historic Places in 1985.
