= Grey Mare's Tail, Conwy =

Waterfall in Snowdonia National Park, Wales

Coordinates: 53.1332°N 3.8100°W

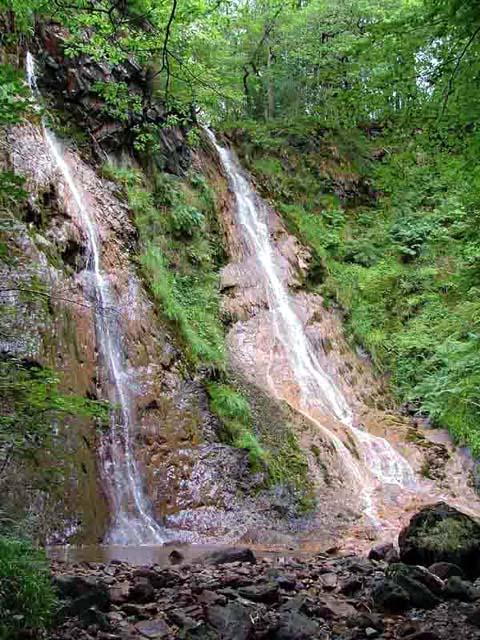
The Grey Mare's Tail

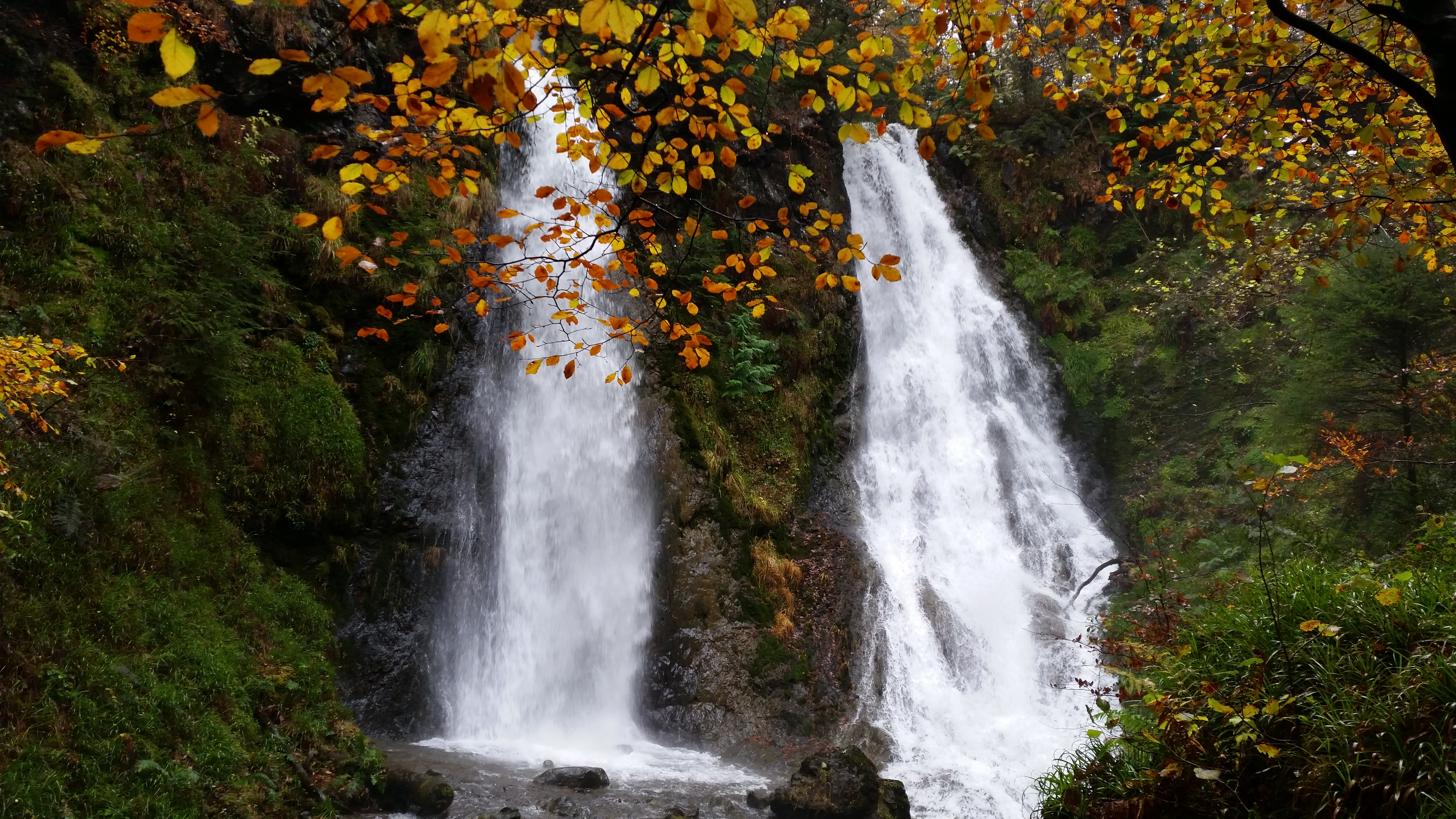
The Grey Mare's Tail after heavy rain

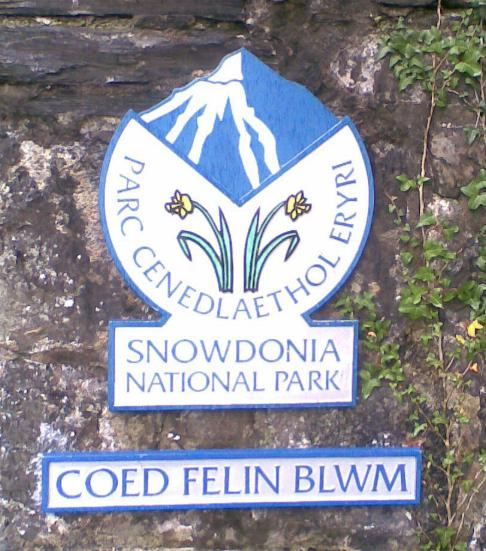
The entrance to Coed Felin Blwm

The Grey Mare's Tail (Welsh: Rhaeadr y Parc Mawr) is a waterfall on the very edge of the Snowdonia National Park near Gwydir Castle in Conwy County Borough, north Wales. It lies just off the B5106 road between the town of Llanrwst and the large village of Trefriw. The Welsh name, Rhaeadr y Parc Mawr, derives from the fact that the falls are fed by a large stream that has its source in the Gwydir Forest, and flows through the old Parc Mine, about a mile to the southeast. The name 'Grey Mare's Tail' was given to it by Lady Willoughby of Gwydir Castle, possibly "in compliment to Lord Byron and the Staubbach" (Byron compared the 900 ft Staubbach Falls in Switzerland to the long white tail of the pale horse upon which death is mounted in the Book of Revelation.)

In all there are some ten types of waterfall, a horsetail being described as a fall where the descending water maintains some contact with bedrock.

Despite its name, this waterfall actually comprises two cascades, the water flowing around both sides of a large rock at the top. However this was possibly not always the case — in 1895 Francis Frith published a postcard showing the "White Mare's Tail Cascade, Llanrwst". Despite the slightly different name ('white') and only showing a single waterfall — as opposed to today's twin cascades — it is probable from the woodland setting that this is indeed the same location.

Below the falls is a shallow plunge pool, and on leaving the wood the waters flow under the road to join eventually the River Conwy.

The woodland area in which the falls lie is known as Coed Felin Blwm ("Lead Mill Wood"), and the remains of mill buildings can be seen near the falls. Felin Blwm lead mill (a name now taken by the adjacent house) was originally erected by the Gwydir Estate to crush ore from Parc Mine in the Gwydir Forest and it is possible that this is the mill listed in surviving 18th-century Estate accounts. A later decline in lead mining saw the mill converted to a sawmill. Both lead and wood from this site was transported down the River Conwy from Trefriw.

The waters of the falls are not especially pure because of the minerals (not just lead) in the rocks of the Gwydir Forest.

When Sir John Wynn was laying out the ornamental gardens at Gwydir Castle in the 1590s, he took a spur of water from above the falls, channelling it along the hillside in a leat. Collected in a header tank, from here the water was of sufficient pressure to feed the fountain in the gardens. This still functions today.

In her book Castles in the Air, the current owner of Gwydir Castle describes the waterfall thus:

No need to improve on the imagery of the Grey Mare's Tail. Suffice it to say, the cascade of water fell from a high point to a low point in a secluded little dell not far from the castle, like a grey mare's tail. The spray from it was bracing even in summer. It had the feel of water that lived most of its life under ground.

The area around the falls is now a nature reserve, owned by Natural Resources Wales, as is much of the adjacent Gwydir Forest. There is a tiny signed car park at the gate, but otherwise the existence of the falls is not signed at all, and remains unknown to many who pass by. The falls can also be reached from above, from the lane which leads up to the hamlet of Llanrhychwyn.

== See also ==
- List of waterfalls
- List of waterfalls in Wales
