= Burr Block =

- U.S. National Register of Historic Places
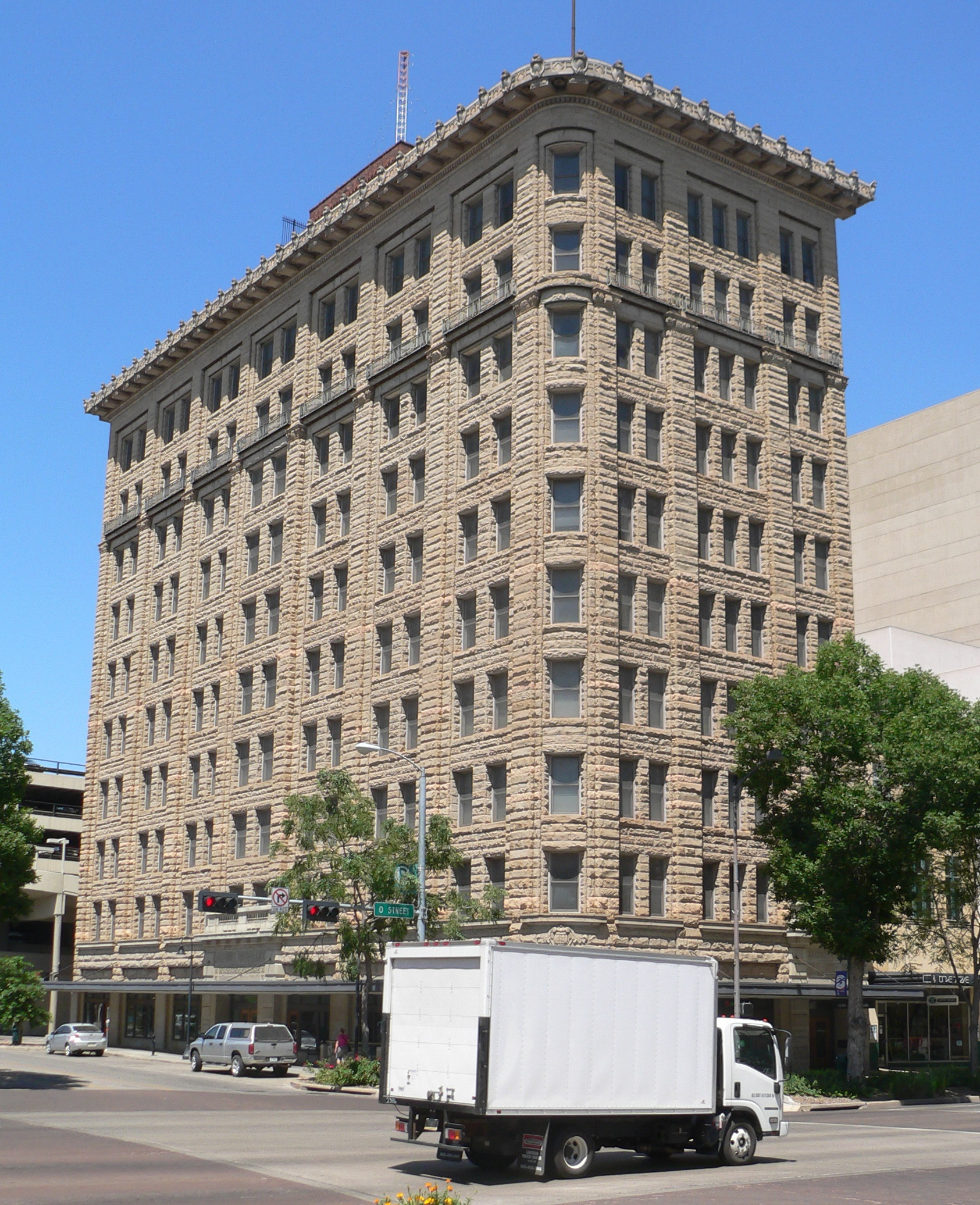

- Location within Nebraska Location within the United States
- Location: 1206 O St., Lincoln, Nebraska
- Coordinates: 40°48′50″N 96°42′14″W
- Area: less than one acre
- Built: 1887
- Built by: James Tyler (1887)
- Architect: James Tyler (1887), Berlinghof & Davis (1916 expansion)
- Architectural style: Late 19th and Early 20th Century American Movements
- NRHP reference No.: 79001448
- Added to NRHP: May 18, 1979

The Burr Block, at 1206 O St. in Lincoln, Nebraska, is a long-salient building which was built in 1887 and later expanded to become a skyscraper. It was listed on the National Register of Historic Places in 1979.

It has also been known as the Security Mutual Building, as the Veterans Administration Building, and as the Anderson Building.

The original designer and construction supervisor was James Tyler. The firm of Berlinghof & Davis apparently were the architects the 1916 expansion when four additional stories were added.

Its NRHP nomination describes its importance as:

historically significant to Lincoln and Nebraska as being a highly visible chronicle of two prosperous eras in the city and state. In this capacity the Burr Block is also an exemplary instance of changing modes in American architecture: initially constructed in 1887 as a romantic Victorian edifice, it was transformed twenty-nine years later into a modern, ten-story "skyscraper"- up-to-date construction methods being employed, but stone remaining the principal medium. These factors accord the Burr Block as a unique remnant of late-19th and early-20th-century business activities on "0" Street, Lincoln's main thoroughfare. Since its initial construction the building has been associated with persons significant on the local, state, and national levels, and for over four decades the building was home office to an important insurance company that experienced tremendous growth during its period of occupancy.
