= Carll House (Huntington, New York) =

Historic house in New York, United States

- U.S. National Register of Historic Places
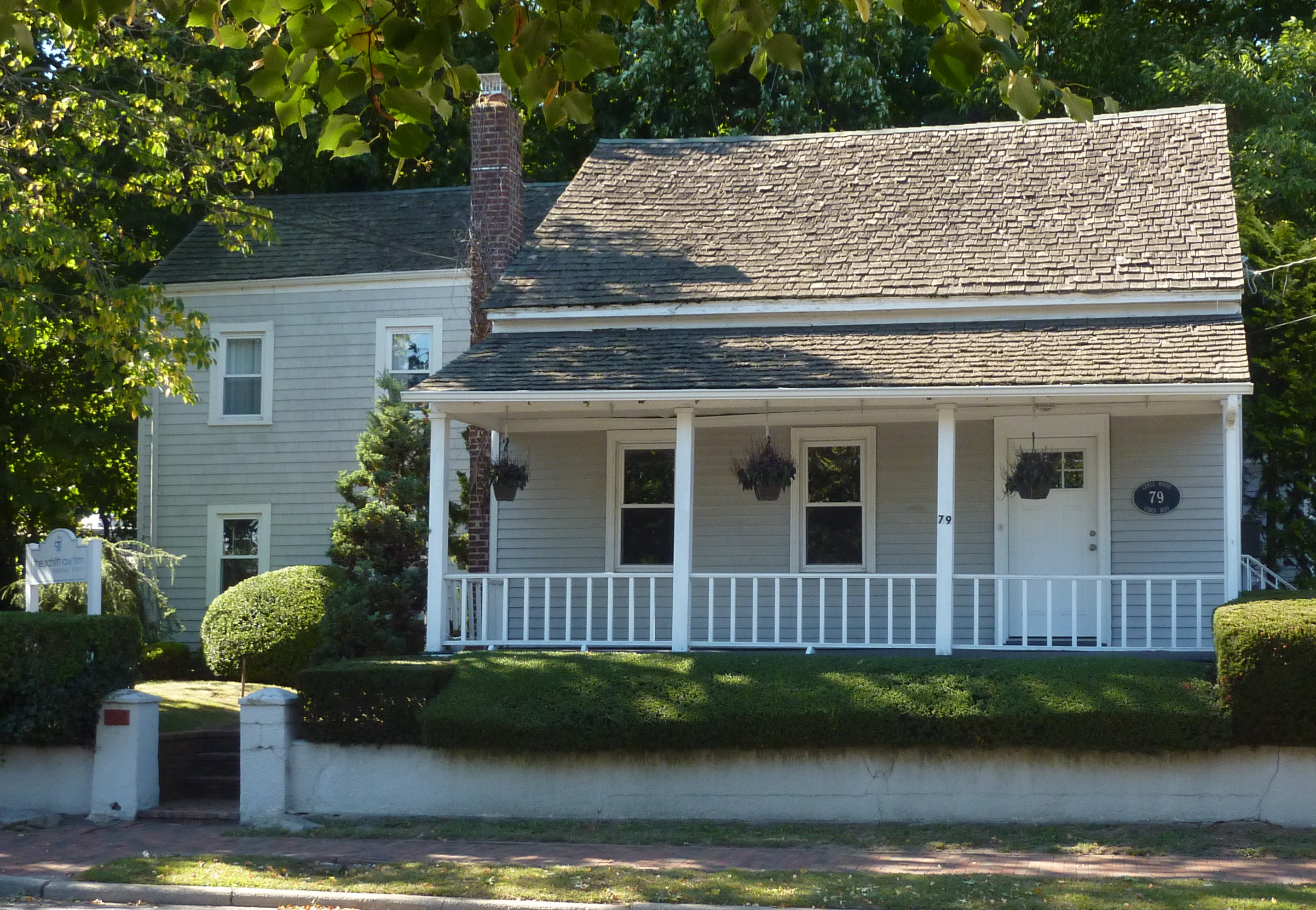

- Location within New York Location within the United States
- Location: 79 Wall Street, Huntington, New York
- Coordinates: 40°52′26.3″N 73°25′40.1″W
- Area: less than one acre
- Built: 1820
- MPS: Huntington Town MRA
- NRHP reference No.: 85002504
- Added to NRHP: September 26, 1985

Carll House is a historic home located on the northwest corner of Wall Street and Central Street in Huntington in Suffolk County, New York. It consists of a 1 1/2-story, three-bay, shingled main residence with a 2-story, three-bay shingled west wing. The earliest section of the house was built about 1820 and the west wing added about 1840.

It was added to the National Register of Historic Places in 1985.
