= Carll House (Dix Hills, New York) =

Historic house in New York, United States

- U.S. National Register of Historic Places
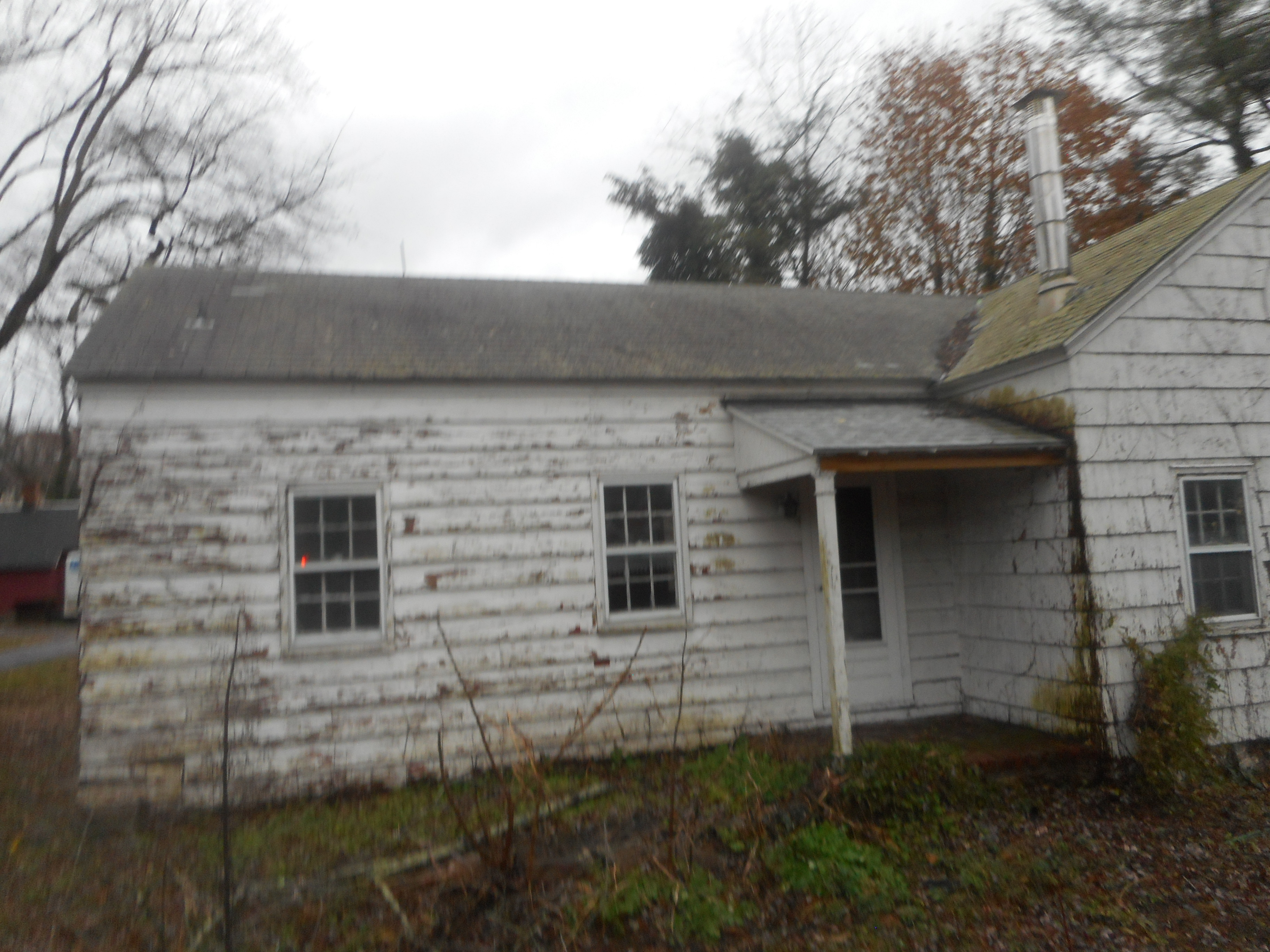
- The Carll House as taken from behind a fence on Deer Park Avenue in November 2019.

- Location within New York Location within the United States
- Location: 380 Deer Park Avenue, Dix Hills, New York
- Area: less than one acre
- Built: 1820
- MPS: Huntington Town MRA
- NRHP reference No.: 85002504; 100008114 (decrease)

Significant dates
- Added to NRHP: September 26, 1985
- Boundary decrease: September 9, 2022

Carll House is a historic home located on Deer Park Avenue across from the vicinity of the intersection with Wolf Hill Road in Dix Hills in Suffolk County, New York. It was built about 1750 and is a 2 1/2-story, five bay gable roof residence with a 1 1/2-story side addition. Also on the property are three contributing 19th century barns, a small pond, and cottage. It was added to the National Register of Historic Places in 1985.
