= Carll S. Burr Mansion =

Historic house in New York, United States

- U.S. National Register of Historic Places
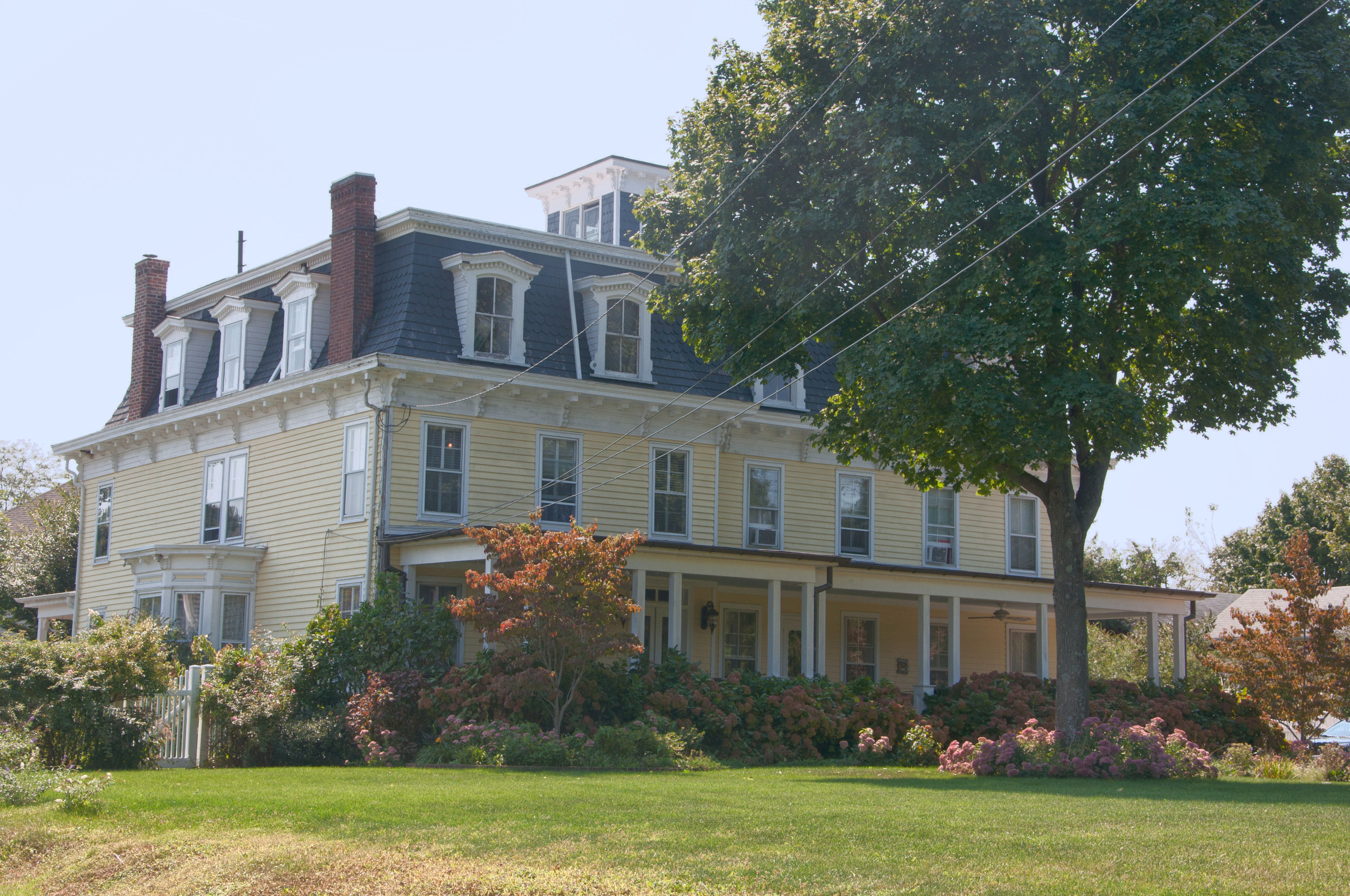
- Carll S. Burr Mansion, September 2012

- Location within New York Location within the United States
- Location: 304 Burr Rd., Commack, New York
- Coordinates: 40°51′4″N 73°17′47″W
- Area: 3 acres (1.2 ha)
- Built: 1830
- Architectural style: Second Empire
- MPS: Huntington Town MRA
- NRHP reference No.: 85002502
- Added to NRHP: September 26, 1985

Carll S. Burr Mansion is a historic home located at Commack in Suffolk County, New York. It is an imposing 2 1/2-story, seven bay shingled residence. The decorative roofline features a flat roofed belvedere with a bracketed cornice and a mansard roof. It was built about 1830 and remodeled in the Second Empire style between 1881 and 1885. Also on the property are a contributing barn and cottage. Additionally it was said to be a horse race training farm during the 19th Century.

It was added to the National Register of Historic Places in 1985.
