= Centreville Course =

Former horse racing course in Queens, New York City

Coordinates: 40°40′37″N 73°50′24″W

- Location: Ozone Park, Queens, New York City, New York, U.S.
- Owned by: New York Trotting Club
- Date opened: 1825
- Course type: Harness racing

Centreville Course, formerly known as the Eclipse Course, was a harness racing track in what is now Ozone Park, Queens, New York City. It was one of the earliest trotting tracks in America.

== History ==
The State of New York's 1802 ban on horse racing and trotting was eased in 1821 when the law was amended to suspend penalties for five years and allow "the training, pacing, trotting, and running of horses" on approved tracks in Queens County, Long Island. The New York Trotting Club (NYTC), established in 1825, sought to improve the speed of road horses, just as racing and jockey clubs had done for riding horses. It was the earliest body to set rules for the sport, racing along today's Third Avenue from Bull's Head Tavern to Harlem.

In 1825, a course was laid out in Queens by the newly formed New York Trotting Club. Originally situated in Woodville (now Woodhaven, Queens), at the intersection of present-day Woodhaven Boulevard and Rockaway Boulevard, the section of land later took the name Ozone Park. The course extended east from the grounds now occupied by John Adams High School to Centreville Street.

First known as the Eclipse Course, the name honored the famous 1823 North versus South contest between American Eclipse and Sir Henry. It was among America's first tracks dedicated solely to racing road horses. The course, near Jamaica, Queens, was about a mile from the Union Course. A surveyor's certificate confirmed the course extended ten feet over a mile when measured at a distance of three feet from the poles.

Following the opening of the course, other tracks quickly followed. From 1830 to 1850, the Centreville Course rivaled the Union Course in the significance of its trotting races. During this time, Joel Conklin was the proprietor of the Centreville Course. Modern racetracks split between thoroughbreds and harness racing, but the Centreville Course hosted both.

On April 25, 1854, The New York Times reported that the track, newly opened for the spring racing season, was praised for its stone- and gravel-free soil, ranking among the North and South's best. That season offered no purses, but the proprietor pledged two-thirds of course receipts to winning horses to encourage trotting matchups.

The Centreville Course was purchased in June 1858 by a newly chartered club formed by influential local residents. The club aimed to elevate the track's standards with major upgrades and strict turf rules to rival Europe's top racing grounds.

Record-breaking performances at the course were set by the following trotting horses: Edwin Forrest rode 2:31½ under saddle in 1834; Pelham trotted 2:28 harnessed in 1849; Highland Maid lowered the harness record to 2:27 in 1853; Lancet clocked 2:25½ under saddle in 1856; and Flora Temple set records of 2:23½ and 2:22 in 1857 and 1859, respectively.

== Closure ==
The course lacked nearby lodging and entertainment like Union Course Tavern at the Union Course, which hurt its popularity.

The Centreville Course land was sold in 1899 to the Ozone Park Land Improvement Company, which subdivided it for homes. The area once home to the Centreville Course is now Ozone Park and the Aqueduct Racetrack.
