= Commack, New York =

- Hamlet and census-designated place
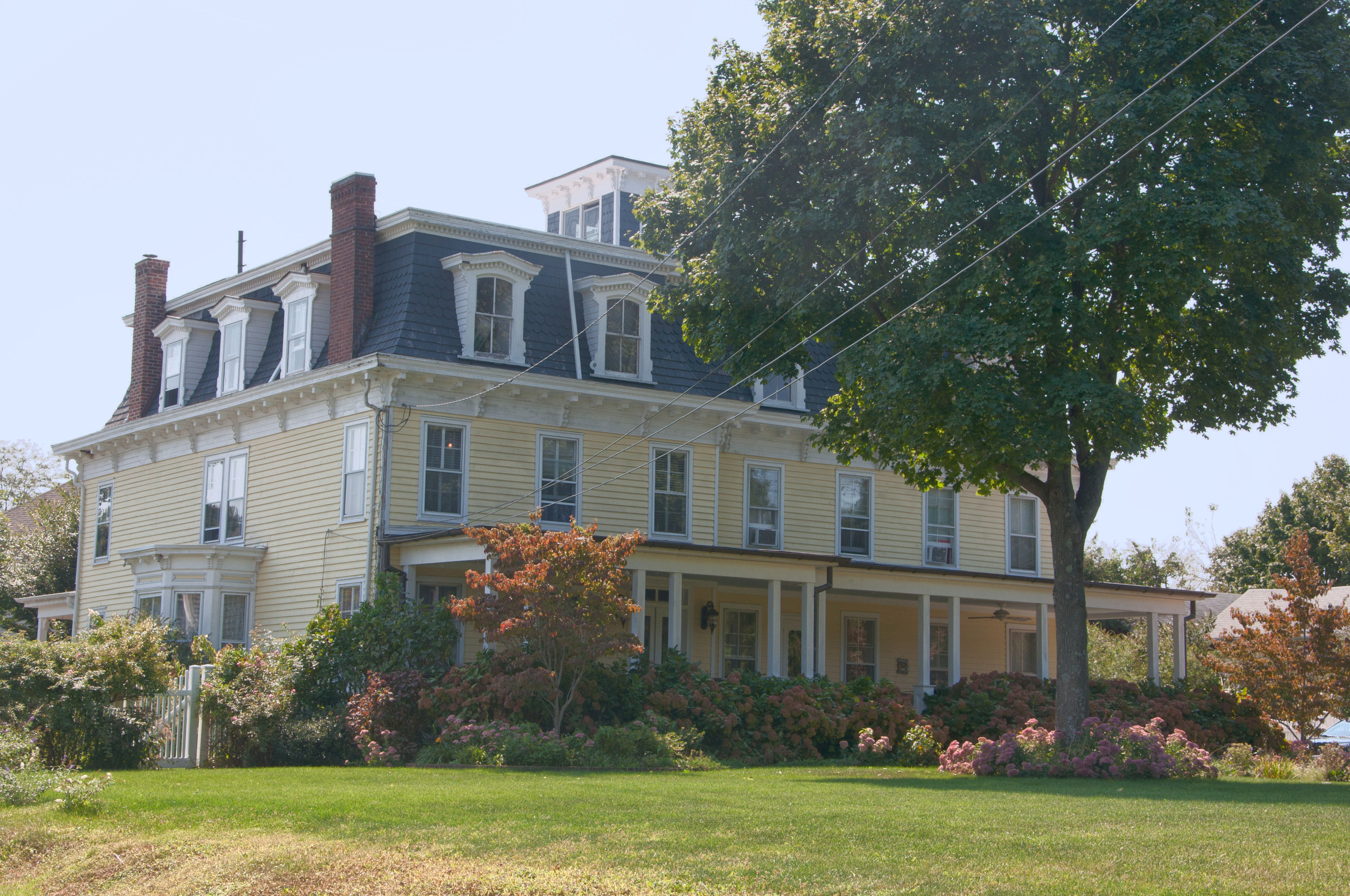
- Commack's historic Carll Burr Mansion in 2012

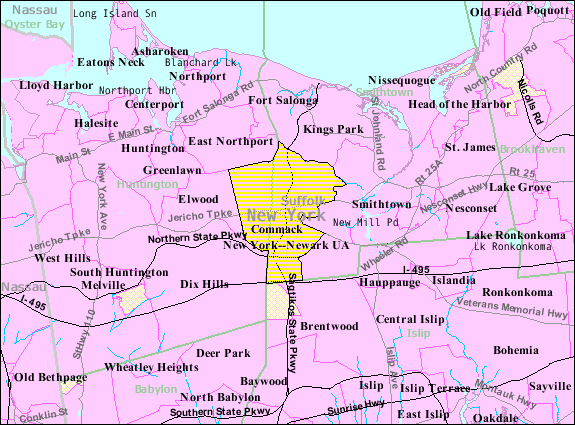
- U.S. Census map

- Location on Long Island Location within the state of New York
- Coordinates: 40°50′42″N 73°17′0″W
- Country: United States
- State: New York
- County: Suffolk
- Towns: Huntington; Smithtown

Area
  - Total: 12.25 sq mi (31.72 km^{2})
  - Land: 12.25 sq mi (31.72 km^{2})
  - Water: 0 sq mi (0.00 km^{2})
- Elevation: 130 ft (40 m)

Population (2020)
  - Total: 36,536
  - Density: 2,982.9/sq mi (1,151.71/km^{2})
- Time zone: UTC-5 (Eastern (EST))
  - Summer (DST): UTC-4 (EDT)
- ZIP code: 11725
- Area codes: 631, 934
- FIPS code: 36-17530
- GNIS feature ID: 0947221

Commack (/ˈkoʊmæk/ KOH-mak) is a hamlet and census-designated place (CDP) in the towns of Huntington and Smithtown in Suffolk County, on Long Island, in New York. The population was 36,536 at the time of the 2020 census.

== History ==
The name "Commack" comes from the Secatogue Native American tribe who lived on the South Shore of Long Island between Copiague and Bayport. The Secatogue named their northern lands in the center of the island Winnecomac which means "pleasant lands." The name may have been inspired because of the area's flat lands with rich soil, and thick oak forests abounding with plants and wildlife. From its earliest days, Commack, originally spelled "Comac" had fertile soil which made it the perfect land for farming.

== Geography ==
According to the United States Census Bureau, the CDP has a total area of 12.0 square miles (31.0 km^{2}), all land.

Commack is a suburban area, and, like most unincorporated places on Long Island, does not have a walkable downtown or "Main Street".

== Demographics ==
Historical population
Census	Pop.	Note	%±
2010	36,124		—
2020	36,536		1.1%
U.S. Decennial Census

=== 2020 census ===
As of the 2020 census, Commack had a population of 36,536. The median age was 44.9 years. 21.2% of residents were under the age of 18 and 19.0% of residents were 65 years of age or older. For every 100 females there were 95.0 males, and for every 100 females age 18 and over there were 92.2 males age 18 and over.

100.0% of residents lived in urban areas, while 0.0% lived in rural areas.

There were 12,009 households in Commack, of which 35.7% had children under the age of 18 living in them. Of all households, 68.9% were married-couple households, 9.6% were households with a male householder and no spouse or partner present, and 18.4% were households with a female householder and no spouse or partner present. About 14.6% of all households were made up of individuals and 9.4% had someone living alone who was 65 years of age or older.

There were 12,312 housing units, of which 2.5% were vacant. The homeowner vacancy rate was 0.6% and the rental vacancy rate was 2.9%.

Racial composition as of the 2020 census
Race	Number	Percent
White	30,245	82.8%
Black or African American	662	1.8%
American Indian and Alaska Native	40	0.1%
Asian	2,547	7.0%
Native Hawaiian and Other Pacific Islander	12	0.0%
Some other race	823	2.3%
Two or more races	2,207	6.0%
Hispanic or Latino (of any race)	2,914	8.0%

=== 2010 census ===
As of the census of 2010, there were 36,124 people, 11,907 households, and 9,895 families residing in the CDP. The population density was 3,010.3 inhabitants per square mile (1,162.3/km^{2}). There were 12,138 housing units at an average density of 1,011.5 per square mile (390.5/km^{2}). The racial makeup of the CDP was 91.6% White, 0.9% African American, 0.1% Native American or Alaska Native, 5.4% Asian, 0.01% Native Hawaiian or other Pacific Islander, 0.8% from some other race, and 1.2% from two or more races. Hispanic or Latino of any race were 4.8% of the population.

In the CDP the population was spread out, with 26.0% under the age of 18, 6.2% from 18 to 24, 21.5% from 25 to 44, 29.5% from 45 to 64, and 16.8% who were 65 years of age or older. The median age was 43.0 years. For every 100 females, there were 94.1 males. For every 100 females age 18 and over, there were 90.6 males.

=== Income ===
According to Census Bureau estimates for 2009–2011, the median income for a household in the CDP was $102,008, and the median income for a family was $114,866. Males had a median income of $83,135 versus $63,185 for females. The per capita income for the CDP was $40,320. About 2.1% of families and 2.9% of the population were below the poverty line, including 1.7% of those under age 18 and 5.0% of those age 65 or over.

== Landmarks ==
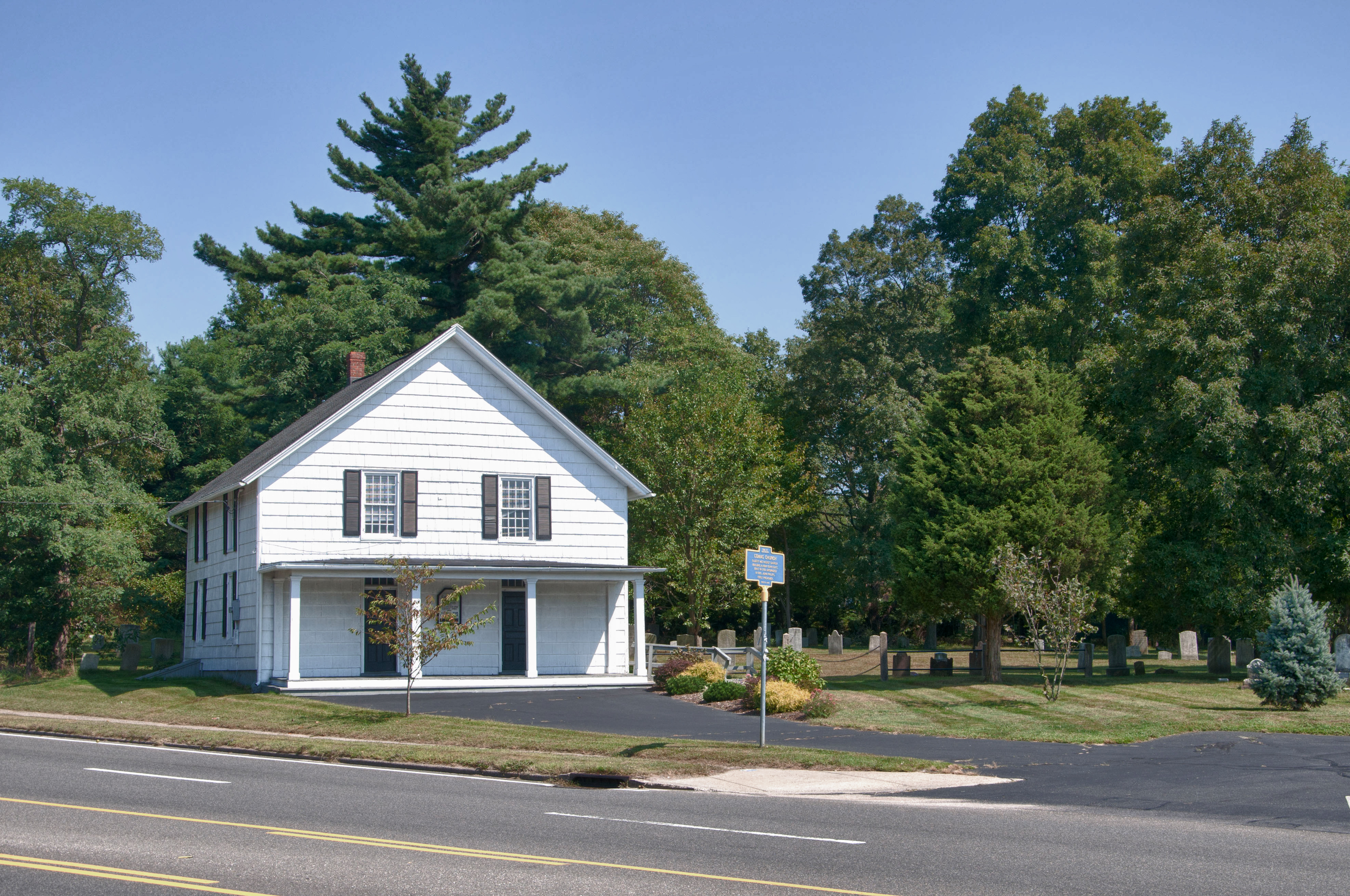
Comac Church

Commack is home to the oldest Methodist Church building in New York state, the Commack Methodist Church, built in 1789 as the Comac Church. It is listed on the National Register of Historic Places and is one of the oldest buildings in Commack.

The American Basketball Association's New York Nets, later the New Jersey Nets, and then the Brooklyn Nets, played their second season (1968–69) at the Long Island Arena in Commack. Musician Peter Frampton recorded some tracks for the album Frampton Comes Alive! during a concert at the arena. The Eastern Hockey League's Long Island Ducks also played there. The arena, demolished in 1996, became the site of a shopping center.

The National Jewish Sports Hall of Fame and Museum is located in the Suffolk Y Jewish Community Center in Commack.

The Commack Fire Department celebrated its centennial in 2006.

Sunshine Acres was built sometime in the mid-1800s and was home to Dr. Darling B. Whitney. The property was sold to the Brooklyn Baptist Young Peoples Union in 1915 and became a fresh air home, or camp, named Sunshine Acres. The house was located on Townline Road just north of the Methodist Church and served as the main building for the camp. The dorms, dining hall, and chapel were on top of the hill across the fields.

Commack Volunteer Ambulance Corps celebrated its 50th anniversary in 2016.

Harned Brothers Sawmill was built in the 1840s and has been run by the Harned family since the Great Depression. It is the only circular-sawmill still in operation on Long Island.

== Education ==
The vast majority of Commack is served by the Commack School District. However, there are small parts of Commack that are served by Northport-East Northport Union Free School District, the Hauppauge Union Free School District, the Smithtown Central School District, and the Kings Park Central School District.

== Transportation ==
Commack is served by four major thoroughfares: the Long Island Expressway, the Northern State Parkway, the Sunken Meadow State Parkway and the at-grade Jericho Turnpike. It also includes the historic Long Island Motor Parkway, which itself included the spur to NY 25 that later became Harned Road.

== Notable people ==
- Bob Costas (born 1952), television sportscaster and commentator; Commack High School South Class of 1970
- Lawrence P. Flynn (1931–2017), Adjutant General of New York
- Craig Greenberg (born 1973), businessman, lawyer, and politician; Mayor of Louisville, Kentucky.
- Pete Harnisch, Major League Baseball pitcher; Commack High School South Class of 1984
- Matt Milano, National Football League linebacker for the Buffalo Bills
- Rosie O'Donnell, stand-up comedian, actress, singer, author, talk show hostess, activist and media personality; Commack High School South Class of 1980
- Shankar Pillai, professional poker player; Commack High School Class of 2002
- Samantha Prahalis, WNBA basketball player; Commack High School Class of 2008
- Randy Rainbow, comedian
- Ashley Reyes, actress and star of The CW revival of the television series Walker; Commack High School Class of 2012
- Stephen Ridings, Former Major League Baseball pitcher for the New York Mets
- Ruth Minsky Sender, author
- Kevin Shields, lead singer of Irish shoegaze band My Bloody Valentine
- Jason Somerville, professional poker player, only openly gay high-stakes player; Commack High School Class of 2005
- Christopher Boundy, marathon runner and Social Studies Teacher
- Else Holmelund Minarik, creator of Little Bear, teacher at Marion E. Carll School

== In popular culture ==
On November 14, 2006, radio station WBLI rated the Commack Motor Inn second of the seven wonders of Long Island, just behind the Flanders Duck and ahead of the Montauk Lighthouse. The Commack Inn gained notoriety by its advertisements on late-night television and radio, extolling "the perfect romantic getaway", its "plush beds", "mirror ball disco room" and "heart-shaped love tubs". By the 1980s, the Commack Motor Inn had become such an accepted part of Long Island life that its gift certificates were prizes at social clubs. In a 1994 interview, actress Rosie O'Donnell recounted, "That's where everyone in high school went to have their first sexual experience."

In the American television program Criminal Minds, Special Agent David Rossi's hometown is Commack. One episode in the fifth season of the same show is set in Commack (although it was shot in Los Angeles).

Commack Middle School was also on one of MTV's True Life episodes.

American rock band Wheatus heavily referenced Commack satirically on their 2000 debut album in their song "Wannabe Gangstar." Additionally, several members of the same band wear shirts displaying the word “Commack” in their music video for Teenage Dirtbag.

== See also ==
- Commack School District
