= Goodbye, Dolly Gray =

1897 music hall song

"Goodbye, Dolly Gray" is a music hall song, with lyrics by American Will D. Cobb and music by American Paul Barnes, (Note: Paul Barnes (pseudonym of George Franklin Feger; 1870 Schuylkill Haven, Pennsylvania – 8 May 1922 New York City) was a vaudeville actor and a second-generation musician, notably, a songwriter. His father, Pvt. William J. Feger, was a musician who, as an E♭ cornetist, served in the 48th Pennsylvania Infantry Regiment Band during the American Civil War under the command of Brig. Gen James Nagle.) first published in 1897 by the Morse Music Publishing Company. The song was the publishers' first hit.

== History ==
The song was popularised as a Boer War anthem, but it was actually written during the earlier Spanish–American War.

== Notable recordings ==
A notable early recording on a 78 rpm record was made in 1901 by Canadian singer Harry Macdonough. In the same year another popular version was recorded by the Big Four Quartette with vocal group members Arthur Collins, Byron Harlan, Joe Natus and A. D. Madeira (Edison 7728). The song featured in Noël Coward's 1931 play Cavalcade and in the movies Lawrence of Arabia (1962), Alfie (1966) and Butch Cassidy and the Sundance Kid (1969). The tune (with different lyrics) is also used in the modern day as "Good Old Collingwood Forever", the club song of the Australian Football League's Collingwood Football Club.

"Goodbye, Dolly Gray" was also recorded by Bruce Lacey and the Alberts in the 1960s, and a modern recording by Stan LePard was featured on Xbox Live Arcade game Toy Soldiers as an opening menu theme.

== Lyrics ==
I have come to say goodbye, Dolly Gray
It's no use to ask me why, Dolly Gray
There's a murmur in the air, you can hear it ev'rywhere,
It is the time to do and dare, Dolly Gray
So if you hear the sound of feet, Dolly Gray
Sounding thro' the village street, Dolly Gray
'Tis the tramp of soldiers' true in their uniforms so blue,
I must say goodbye to you, Dolly Gray!

Refrain:
Goodbye Dolly I must leave you, tho' it breaks my heart to go
Something tells me I am needed at the front to fight the foe
See - the boys in blue are marching and I can no longer stay,
Hark - I hear the bugle calling, goodbye Dolly Gray!

Hear the rolling of the drums, Dolly Gray
Back from war the reg'ment comes, Dolly Gray
On your lovely face so fair, I can see a look of fear
For your soldier boy's not there, Dolly Gray
For the one you love so well, Dolly Gray
In the midst of battle fell, Dolly Gray
With his face toward the foe, as he died he murmured low,
"I must say goodbye and go, Dolly Gray!"

Refrain
