= Paul Barnes (songwriter) =

American songwriter (1868–1922)

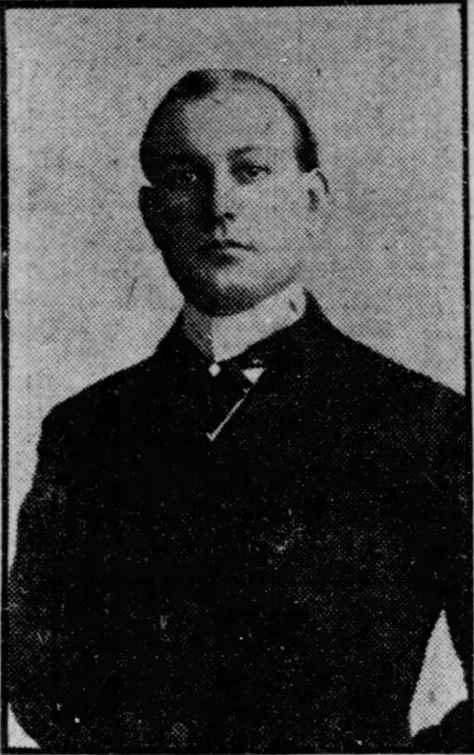
- Born: George Franklin Feger; October 10, 1868; Schuylkill Haven, Pennsylvania
- Died: May 8, 1922 (aged 53); New York, New York
- Occupation(s): Songwriter, actor, singer
- Notable work: "Goodbye, Dolly Gray"

Paul Barnes (pseudonym of George Franklin Feger; October 10, 1868 – May 8, 1922) was a vaudeville comedic actor, singer, pianist, and songwriter who, with Will D. Cobb as lyricist, in 1897 composed the Spanish–American War-era hit, "Goodbye, Dolly Gray."

== Selected works ==
=== Worked published by Cruger Bros., New York ===
The following works were published by Cruger Bros., New York: (Note: Cruger Bros., music publisher, was a New York firm run by three brothers, Bertram Cruger (1859–1943), Melvin Sheppard Cruger (1965–1916), and Randolph "Dox" Cruger (1858–1938), a composer. Their office was located at 39 West 28th Street, between Broadway and 6th Avenue, Manhattan, in what then was Tin Pan Alley.)

- "The moon and Crescent" (©1894), Paul Barnes (w&m) OCLC 681500347
- "My Sweetheart Gets Married To Me," ballad (©1894), Paul Barnes (w&m), OCLC 497648186
- "Love Me As I Love You," ballad (©1894), Paul Barnes (w&m), OCLC 497647638
- "A Venetian Lullaby" (©1894), Emil Oscar Wolff (1858–1929) (music), Paul Barnes (words), OCLC 498330451
- "Forget Me Not," ballad (©1894), Paul Barnes (w&m), OCLC 497647533
- "In the Old Churchyard," ballad (©1894), Paul Barnes (w&m), OCLC 497647615
- "Pretty Little Mary" (©1894), Paul Barnes (w&m), OCLC 497648251
- "Please Come Home," ballad (©1894), Paul Barnes (w&m), OCLC 497648236
- "Thoughts of Thee," ballad (©1894), Dox Cruger (music), Paul Barnes (words), OCLC 497779785
- "Nellie Mavourneen Sweetheart" (©1894), Dox Cruger (music), Paul Barnes (words), OCLC 497779736
- "I'm the Boy for Nellie" (©1894), Dox Cruger (music), Paul Barnes (words), OCLC 497647600
- "Since Katie Moved Away," ballad (©1894), Paul Barnes (w&m), OCLC 497648272
- "A Few Old Broken Playthings," ballad (©1894), Paul Barnes (w&m), OCLC 497647506
- "Pretty Little Mountain Pink," ballad (©1894), Paul Barnes (w&m), OCLC 497648263
- "Nannie Gray," ballad (©1894), Paul Barnes (w&m), OCLC 497648197
- "Darling Nellie" (©1894), Paul Barnes (w&m), OCLC 497647484
- "Dreamland," cradle song (©1894), Dox Cruger (music), Paul Barnes (words), OCLC 497779063
- "The Ferryman" (©1894), Dox Cruger (music), Paul Barnes (words), OCLC 497779071
- "The Bellman" (©1895), Paul Barnes (w&m), OCLC 497647444
- "Heigh-Ho!" (©1894), Dox Cruger (music), Paul Barnes (words), OCLC 497779141
- "Swinging on de Golden Gate" (©1894), Paul Barnes (w&m), OCLC 54688663
- "Love by Telephone" (©1894), Emil Oscar Wolff (1858–1929) (music), Paul Barnes (words), OCLC 1061988234, 498330382
- "What Do You Think of That?" (©1894), Paul Barnes (w&m), OCLC 58561097

=== Worked published by Morse Music Publishing Company ===
The following works were published by Morse Music Publishing Company:

- "Goodbye, Dolly Gray" (1897), Paul Barnes (music), Will D. Cobb (words)

=== Worked published by Howley, Haviland & Dresser ===
The following works were published by Howley, Haviland & Dresser:

- "Down by the Riverside" (©1900), Paul Barnes (w&m), OCLC 48596907
- "Josephine, My Jo" (©1898), Paul Barnes (w&m), OCLC 497647625
- "For I Want To Be a Soldier," comic song & chorus (©1898), Paul Barnes (w&m), OCLC 497647520
- "One I Love, Two I Love" (©1900), Paul Barnes (w&m), OCLC 497648214
- "I Love You Dearly, For I Love No One But You" (©1902), Paul Barnes (w&m), OCLC 497647590
- "Buzzin' Around" (©1903), Paul Barnes (w&m), OCLC 50925255
- "Down in the Meadow Where the Green Grass Grows" (©1903), Theodore F. Morse (music), Paul Barnes (words), OCLC 1061749760

=== Worked published by Paul Dresser Publishing Company ===
The following works were published by Paul Dresser Publishing Company:

- "When the Right Little Girl Comes Along" (©1905), E. Ray Goetz (music), Paul Barnes (words), OCLC 1061711759

== Family ==
Paul Barnes' father, Pvt. William J. Feger, was a musician (E♭ cornetist) and organizer and leader of a band in the 48th Pennsylvania Infantry Regiment during the American Civil War under the command of Brig. Gen James Nagle.
