= Will D. Cobb =

American songwriter

William Denight Cobb (July 5, 1876 – January 20, 1930) was an American lyricist and composer. He and a partner, Ren Shields, produced several popular musicals and musical comedies in the early 20th century. Cobb also had a long-run collaboration with Gus Edwards.

== Personal life ==
Cobb was born July 5, 1876, in Philadelphia, and grew up there, but also lived several years in New York City. Cobb graduated 1893 from Girard College in Philadelphia. Before becoming a songwriter, he worked as a salesman in a department store. Cobb died January 20, 1930, in Manhattan, New York City, and was buried in Arlington Cemetery, Drexel Hill, Pennsylvania.

== Career ==
Cobb was a prolific lyricist and composer in the early 1900s. His career spanned from approximately 1901 through the late 1920s. Early in his career, he collaborated with Ren Shields, best known for his hit, "In the Good Old Summer Time". Over the course of his career, he worked with Buddy DeSylva, George Gershwin, Harry Ruby, and Earl Carroll, among others. He joined ASCAP in 1927, his chief musical collaborator was Gus Edwards (vaudeville).

He is responsible for writing the line still sung by schoolchildren in the United States, "School days, school days; dear old golden rule days. Readin' and 'ritin' and 'rithmetic; taught to the tune of a hick'ry stick," which came from his song, "School Days", published in 1907.

In 1897, Cobb wrote the lyrics and Paul Barnes (Note: Paul Barnes (pseudonym of George Franklin Feger; 1870 Schuylkill Haven, Pennsylvania – May 8, 1922, New York City) was a vaudeville actor and a second-generation musician, notably, a songwriter. His father, Pvt. William J. Feger, was a musician who, as an E♭ cornetist, served in the 48th Pennsylvania Infantry Regiment Band during the American Civil War under the command of Brig. Gen James Nagle.) composed the music to the Spanish–American War-era song "Goodbye, Dolly Gray." In the early 1900s, the song was adopted with re-written lyrics, as the theme song for the Australian Football League club, Collingwood.

== Productions ==
=== Broadway ===
- Tintypes — Musical revue featuring songs by Will D. Cobb – October 23, 1980 – January 11, 1981
- The French Doll — Musical with lyrics by Will D. Cobb – February 20, 1922 – June 3, 1922
- Ziegfeld Follies of 1913 — Musical revue with additional music by Will D. Cobb – June 16, 1913 – September 6, 1913
- Ziegfeld Follies of 1910 — Musical revue featuring songs by Will D. Cobb – June 20, 1910 – September 3, 1910
- The Boys and Betty — Musical featuring songs with lyrics by Will D. Cobb – November 2, 1908 – February 6, 1909
- School Days — musical, lyrics for Sunbonnet Sue by Will D. Cobb – September 14, 1908 – October 10, 1908
- The-Merry-Go-Round — musical comedy, lyrics to The Shop Window Girls by Will D. Cobb – April 25, 1908 – July 18, 1908
- A Parisian Model – musical comedy with interpolated songs by Will D. Cobb – January 6, 1908 – January 25, 1908
- His Honor the Mayor — musical comedy revival with music by Cobb and Shields – November 25, 1907 – December 7, 1907
- Hip! Hip! Hooray! — musical comedy, lyrics for You'll Never Know What Love Is Until I Love You by Will D. Cobb – October 10, 1907 – December 7, 1907
- The Gay White Way — musical revue featuring Dixie Dan by Will D. Cobb – October 7, 1907 – January 4, 1908
- The Girl Behind the Counter — musical comedy featuring The Cherry in the Glass by Will D. Cobb – October 1, 1907 – June 6, 1908
- Ziegfeld Follies of 1907 — musical revue featuring songs with lyrics by Will D. Cobb – July 8, 1907 – November 10, 1907
- His Honor the Mayor — musical comedy with music by Cobb and Shields – June 3, 1907 – June 15, 1907
- A Parisian Model — musical with additional numbers by Mr. Cobb – November 27, 1906 – June 29, 1907
- About Town – musical revue, with additional lyrics by Will D. Cobb – November 15, 1906 – December 29, 1906
- His Honor the Mayor — musical with Music by Cobb and Shields – September 17, 1906 – September 29, 1906
- About Town — musical revue with additional numbers by Will D. Cobb – August 30, 1906 – November 10, 1906
- His Honor the Mayor – musical comedy with additional lyrics by Cobb and Shields – May 28, 1906 – August 25, 1906
- Woodland — musical, featuring songs with lyrics by Will D. Cobb – November 21, 1904 – Aug 1905
- Mrs. Black Is Back musical, featuring songs with lyrics by Will D. Cobb — November 7, 1904 – April 1, 1905
- The Wizard of Oz — songs with Gus Edwards — March 21, 1904 – November 25, 1905
- The Medal and the Maid — musical comedy – lyrics for "In Zanzibar" by Will D. Cobb – January 11, 1904 – Mar 1904
- Mr. Bluebeard – musical, with additional numbers by Will D. Cobb – January 21, 1903 – May 16, 1903
- The Wizard of Oz — songs with Gus Edwards — January 20, 1903 – October 3, 1903
- The Supper Club — musical comedy, music & lyrics by Will D. Cobb – December 23, 1901 – January 25, 1902
- The Strollers — musical comedy, additional lyrics by Will D. Cobb – June 24, 1901 – August 31, 1901

=== Songs, as lyricist ===
The Morse Music Company

- "Goodbye, Dolly Gray" (1897), Paul Barnes (music)

Howley, Haviland & Co.

- I Couldn't Stand To See My Baby Lose" (1899), Gus Edwards (music)

F. A. Mills Music Publisher

- "I'll be with you when the roses bloom again" (1901), Gus Edwards (music)
- "Waltz Me Around Again, Willie" (1906), Ren Shields (music)

T. B. Harms & Francis, Day & Hunter, Inc.

- "If a Table at Rector's Could Talk" (1913), Raymond Hubbell (music)

M. Witmark & Sons

- "Good Bye and Luck Be with You Laddie Boy" (1917), Gus Edwards (music)
- "Welcome Home, Laddie Boy, Welcome Home" (1918), Gus Edwards (music)
- "On a Lightless Night with You" (1918), Gus Edwards (music)
- "Private Mike McGee" (1918), Gus Edwards (music)

The Song Review Company

- "Au Revoir" (1918), Gus Edwards (music)
- "He's Long and Lean and Lanky" (1918), Gus Edwards (music)
- "That Grand Old Gentleman (Uncle Sam)" (1918), Gus Edwards (music)
- "You're Your Mamma's Little Daddy Now" (1918), Gus Edwards (music)

Shapiro, Bernstein & Co.

- "Keep on A-Going" (1904), Gus Edwards (music)
- "The Tale of a Cassowary" (1904), Gus Edwards (music)
- "Johnny I'll Take You" (1904), Gus Edwards (music) OCLC 26007446, 1061687455, 1061679140
- "I'll Never Love Another Love Like I Love You" (1904), Gus Edwards (music); OCLC 26773731, 1061647573, 1061682979
- "Sunbonnet Sue" (1908), Gus Edwards (music)

Jos. W. Stern & Co.

- "Mothers of Men" (1917), Gus Edwards (music)

Delmar Music

- "School Days (When We Were A Couple of Kids)" (1907), Gus Edwards (music)

Other publishers

- "I Love Only One Girl in the Wide, Wide World" (1903), Gus Edwards (music)
