= Robert Reid (soldier) =

American Civil War Medal of Honor recipient

Robert Alexander Reid
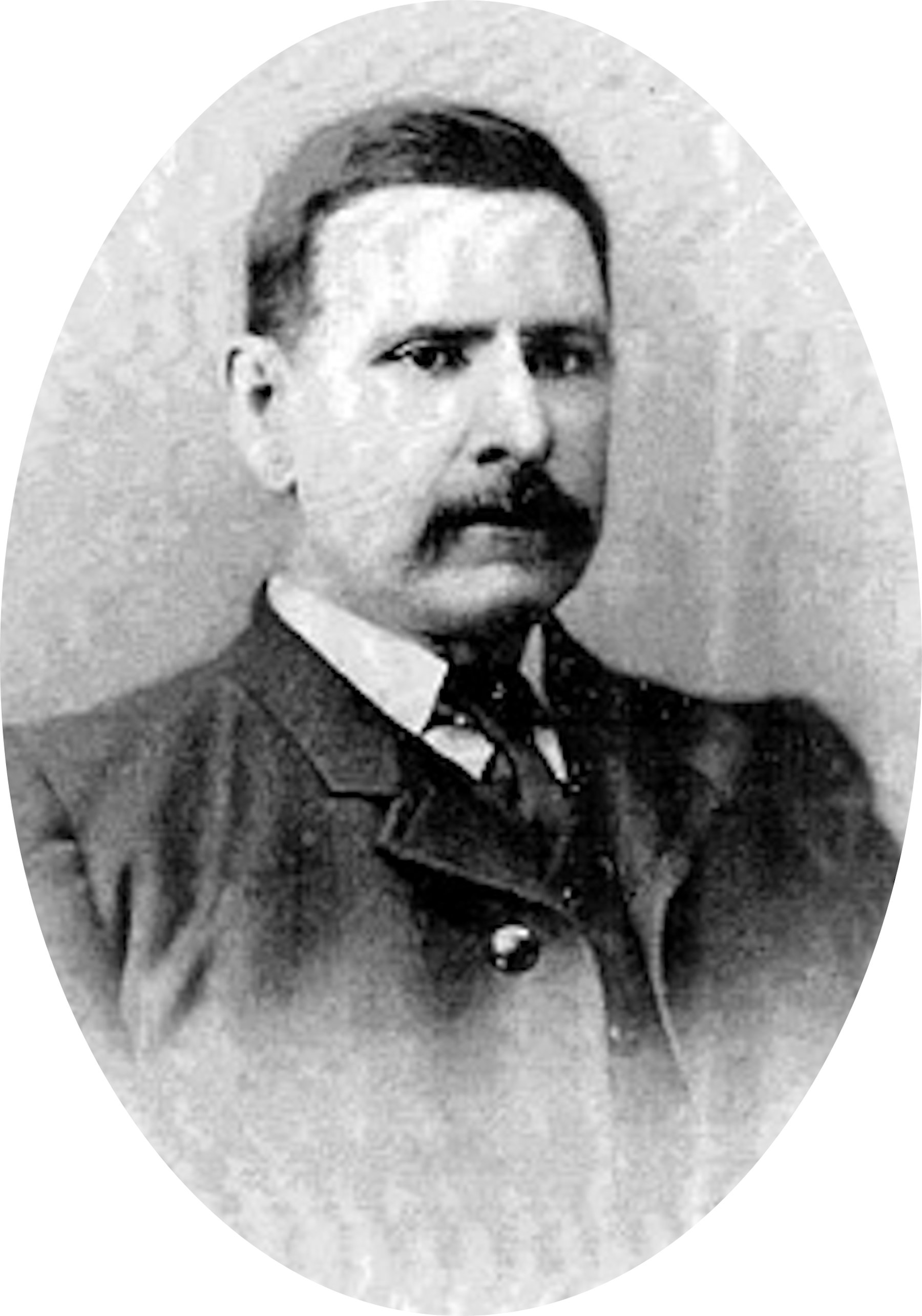
- Reid c. 1880
- Born: January 22, 1842; Raploch, Stirling, Scotland
- Died: April 25, 1929 (aged 87)
- Burial place: Pottsville, Pennsylvania
- Military career
- Allegiance: United States
- Branch: United States Army
- Rank: Private
- Units: Company G, 48th Pennsylvania Infantry Regiment
- Conflicts: American Civil War • Second Battle of Petersburg
- Awards: Medal of Honor

Robert Alexander Reid (January 22, 1842 – April 25, 1929) was a Union Army soldier in the American Civil War who received the U.S. military's highest decoration, the Medal of Honor, for his actions at the Second Battle of Petersburg.

Born on January 22, 1842, in the Raploch district of Stirling, Scotland, Reid joined the Army from Pottsville, Pennsylvania. He served during the Civil War as a private in Company G of the 48th Pennsylvania Infantry Regiment.

At the Second Battle of Petersburg on June 17, 1864, Reid's division, under Brigadier General Robert Brown Potter, launched a stealthy pre-dawn attack on a Confederate-held farmhouse known as the Shand House. The Confederates were caught totally by surprise and were either captured or fled from their positions. Reid himself captured a dozen men and then took the battle flag of the 44th Tennessee Infantry Regiment. For this action, he was awarded the Medal of Honor five months later on December 1, 1864. One of his fellow soldiers from the 48th Pennsylvania, Corporal Patrick Monaghan, also received the Medal of Honor for his part in the same attack.

Reid's official Medal of Honor citation reads:

Capture of flag of 44th Tennessee Infantry (C.S.A.).

Reid died on April 25, 1929, at age 87 and was buried in Pottsville, Pennsylvania.
