= Girardville, Pennsylvania =

Borough in Pennsylvania, US

- Borough
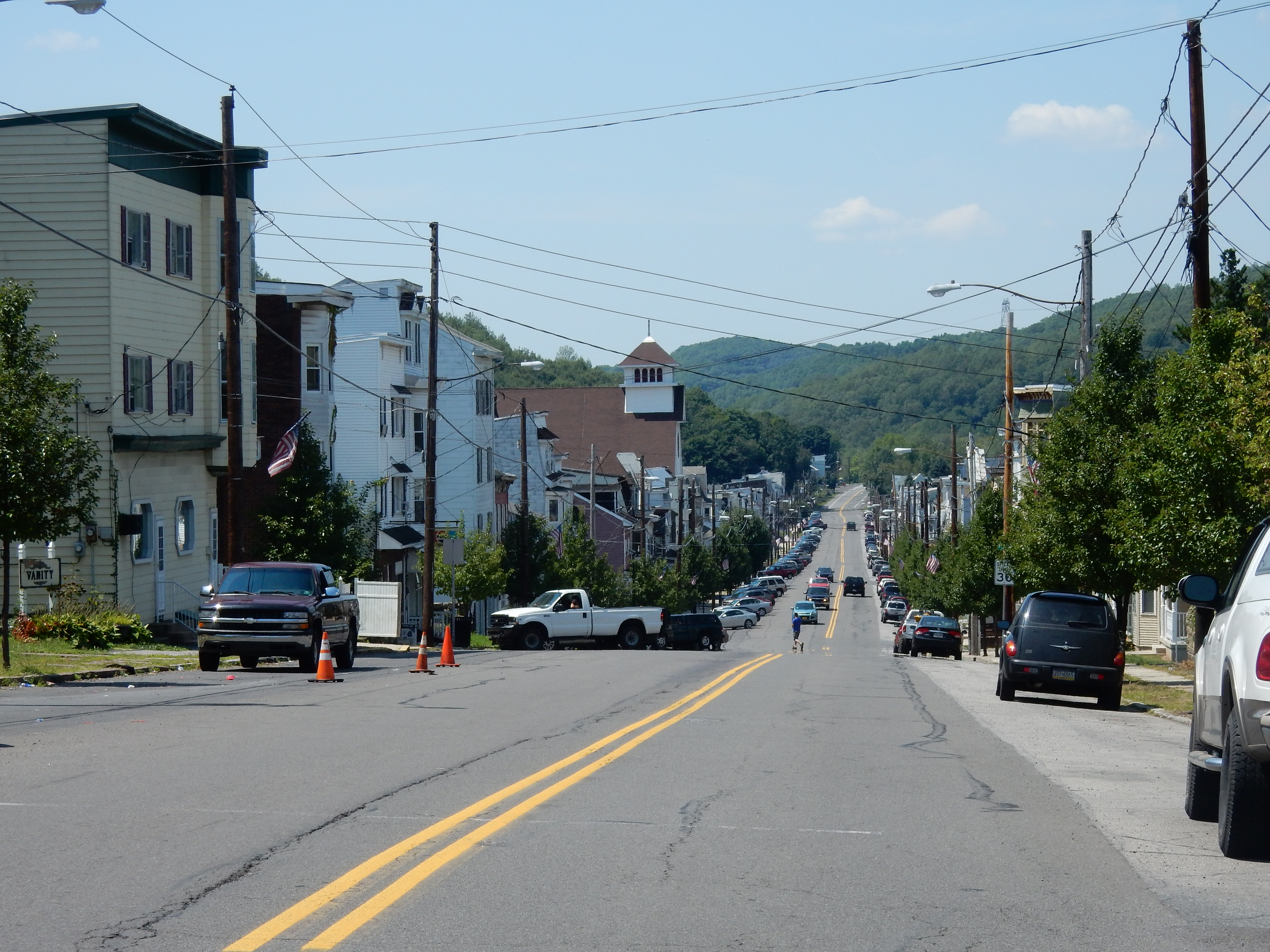
- Main Street in Girardville

- Location of Girardville in Schuylkill County, Pennsylvania.

- Location in Pennsylvania Girardville (the United States)
- Coordinates: 40°47′32″N 76°17′04″W
- Country: United States
- State: Pennsylvania
- County: Schuylkill
- Settled: 1832
- Incorporated: 1872

Government
  - Type: Borough Council

Area
  - Total: 0.53 sq mi (1.37 km^{2})
  - Land: 0.52 sq mi (1.34 km^{2})
  - Water: 0.012 sq mi (0.03 km^{2})
- Elevation: 1,007 ft (307 m)

Population (2020)
  - Total: 1,308
  - Density: 2,526.7/sq mi (975.56/km^{2})
- Time zone: UTC−5 (Eastern (EST))
  - Summer (DST): UTC−4 (EDT)
- ZIP code: 17935
- Area codes: 570 and 272
- FIPS code: 42-29264

Girardville (nicknamed Guntown) is a borough in Schuylkill County, Pennsylvania, United States, 58 miles (93 km) northwest of Reading. Anthracite coal deposits are in the region. Coal-mining provided employment and incomes for many residents. As of the 2020 census, Girardville had a population of 1,308. It was founded in 1832 and is named after Stephen Girard of Philadelphia, who purchased large land holdings in and around the town. It was incorporated as a borough in 1872.

== Geography ==
Girardville is located at 40°47′32″N 76°17′4″W (40.792104, -76.284555).

According to the United States Census Bureau, the borough has a total area of 0.5 square miles (1.3 km^{2}), of which 0.5 square miles (1.3 km^{2}) is land and 1.85% is water.

== Demographics ==
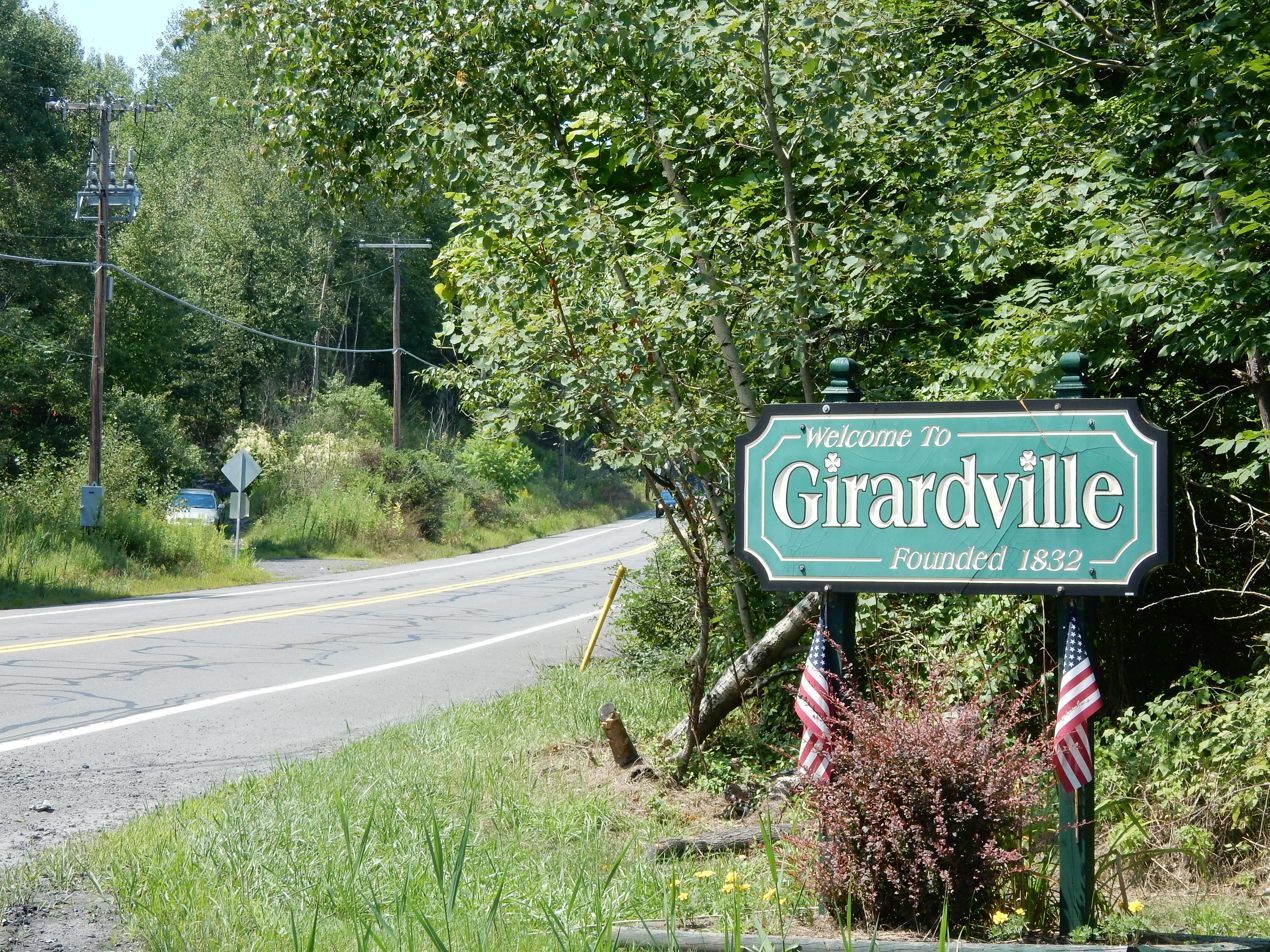
Road to Girardville.

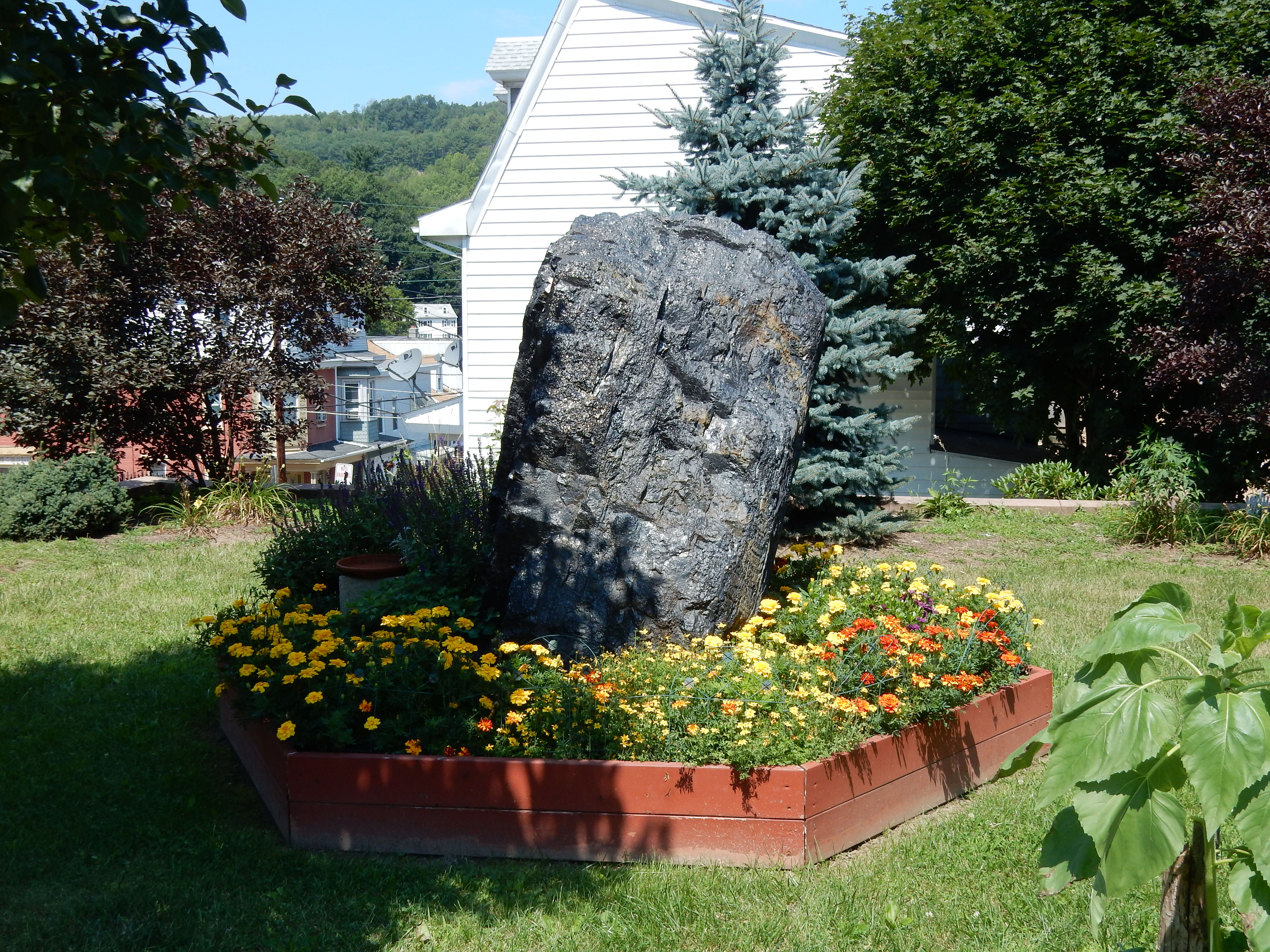
The Anthracite on Main Street.

Historical population
Census	Pop.	Note	%±
1880	2,730		—
1890	3,584		31.3%
1900	3,666		2.3%
1910	4,396		19.9%
1920	4,482		2.0%
1930	4,891		9.1%
1940	4,602		−5.9%
1950	3,864		−16.0%
1960	2,958		−23.4%
1970	2,450		−17.2%
1980	2,268		−7.4%
1990	1,889		−16.7%
2000	1,742		−7.8%
2010	1,519		−12.8%
2020	1,308		−13.9%
2021 (est.)	1,316	▲	0.6%

As of the census of 2000, there were 1,742 people, 767 households, and 486 families residing in the borough. The population density was 3,327.4 inhabitants per square mile (1,284.7/km^{2}). There were 886 housing units at an average density of 1,692.4 per square mile (653.4/km^{2}). The racial makeup of the borough was 99.43% White, 0.11% Native American, 0.06% from other races, and 0.40% from two or more races. Hispanic or Latino of any race were 0.17% of the population.

There were 767 households, out of which 23.7% had children under the age of 18 living with them, 41.5% were married couples living together, 14.1% had a female householder with no husband present, and 36.6% were non-families. 34.4% of all households were made up of individuals, and 19.0% had someone living alone who was 65 years of age or older. The average household size was 2.27 and the average family size was 2.90.

In the borough the age distribution of the population shows 22.1% under the age of 18, 6.6% from 18 to 24, 27.3% from 25 to 44, 23.2% from 45 to 64, and 20.8% who were 65 years of age or older. The median age was 42 years. For every 100 females, there were 91.6 males. For every 100 females age 18 and over, there were 84.6 males.

The median income for a household in the borough was $23,702, and the median income for a family was $30,000. Males had a median income of $26,906 versus $20,433 for females. The per capita income for the borough was $13,735. About 10.5% of families and 14.6% of the population were below the poverty line, including 28.7% of those under age 18 and 9.4% of those age 65 or over.

== Education ==
The borough is served by North Schuylkill School District.

== Notable people ==
Dennis Cardinal Dougherty, Archbishop of the Archdiocese of Philadelphia, was born in the village of Homesville on the outskirts of Girardville in 1865 and served as Archbishop of Philadelphia from 1918 until his death in 1951.

"Captain Jack" Crawford, a western actor, scout for General George Crook's campaign in the Black Hills, and performer with Buffalo Bill Cody, originally from Carndonagh, Ireland, was the first postmaster of Girardville, where he was also a miner.

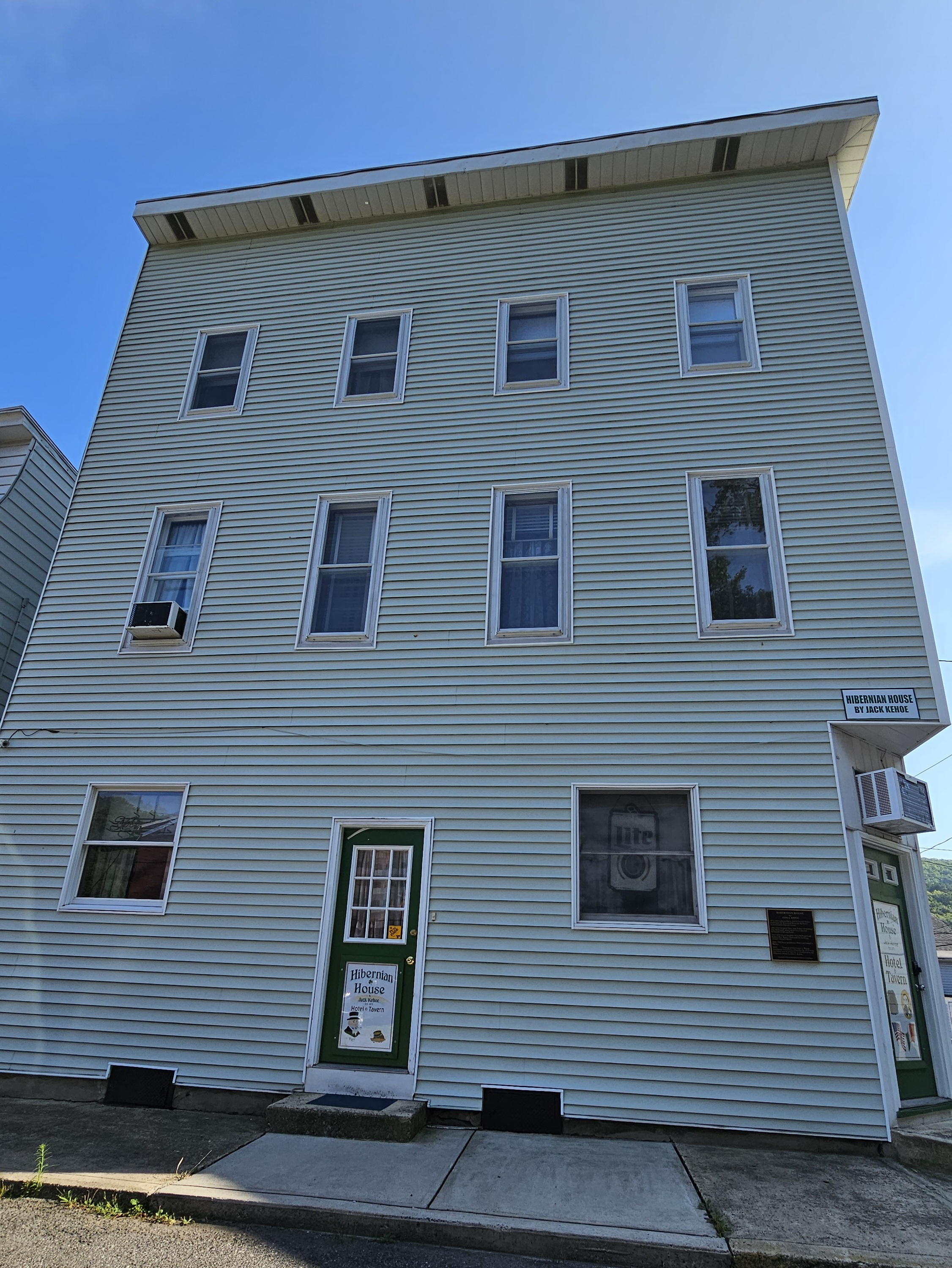
The Hibernian House in 2023

John "Black Jack" Kehoe was the high constable of Girardville during the 1870s and a leader in the fight for labor rights by coal miners. Jack Kehoe was a member of the Ancient Order of Hibernians and several divisions of the AOH now bear his name. Kehoe has gone down in history as a member of the Molly Maguires, a group of Irish immigrants who committed acts against the mine and railroad owners, and was hanged along with 19 other alleged Molly Maguires in a series of trials. These hangings are popularly known as "The Day of the Rope." Today, Black Jack's tavern in Girardville, The Hibernian House, continues to be operated by his great-grandson, Joseph Wayne. Wayne's efforts in the 1970s obtained a posthumous pardon for his great-grandfather by Pennsylvania governor Milton Shapp. Kehoe, a native of County Wicklow, Ireland, was buried in old St. Jerome's Cemetery in Tamaqua. His gravesite is a historical site maintained by the Ancient Order of Hibernians.

Colonel Patrick H. Monaghan, a native of County Mayo, Ireland, who emigrated at the age of five and later became a naturalized American citizen, won the U.S. Medal of Honor for recapturing the regimental flag of the 7th New York Heavy Artillery on June 17, 1864, while fighting in the Siege of Petersburg during the American Civil War. A teacher in Schuylkill County from 1873 to 1916, Monaghan was also appointed to the post of superintendent of the school system in Girardville, a position he continued to hold from the early 1880suntil August 20, 1909, when he was moved by his school board into an elementary school principal's position:

Girardville native Jimmy Gownley created the comic book series Amelia Rules!. The series, begun in 2001, has won several awards, been translated into numerous languages, and even turned into a stage musical. In 2008, it was named the Pennsylvania Library Association's One Book Award Winner. Although Gownley is no longer a resident of Girardville, his work references the town in many ways, including being set in a fictional version of Connerton, a town formerly located between Girardville, and Lost Creek.

Joseph, Charles, and Albert Drulis were born and raised in Girardville. All three played football at Temple University, and Charles and Albert went on to play in the NFL. All three brothers have been inducted into the Pennsylvania sports hall of fame. Chuck Drulis was an all-pro lineman for the Chicago Bears and went on to coach in the NFL after his playing career. He is credited with introducing the "safety blitz" into the league while he was the defensive coordinator with the St. Louis Cardinals.

Baseball player Chick Fullis was born in Girardville in 1901.

== Landmarks ==
=== Churches ===
Girardville had six churches: one New Community Fellowship Church; one Methodist Episcopal; one Lutheran; and two Roman Catholic Churches, St. Vincent de Paul and St. Joseph. St. Joseph's Church was closed July, 2015, while St. Vincent's was kept open as a worship center for the newly formed Parish of St. Charles Borremeo, with the main church in Ashland (the former St.Joseph's). Girardville Primitive Methodist Church stood at the corner of Main and Richard Streets for 132 years before its demolition in October of 2012.

== Notable events ==
Girardville is the site of an annual St. Patrick's Day parade that is one of the largest in Pennsylvania. It made history on March 29, 2008, when former President Bill Clinton joined the parade. The annual Girardville St. Patrick's Day Parade was last celebrated in 2023.

== Gallery ==
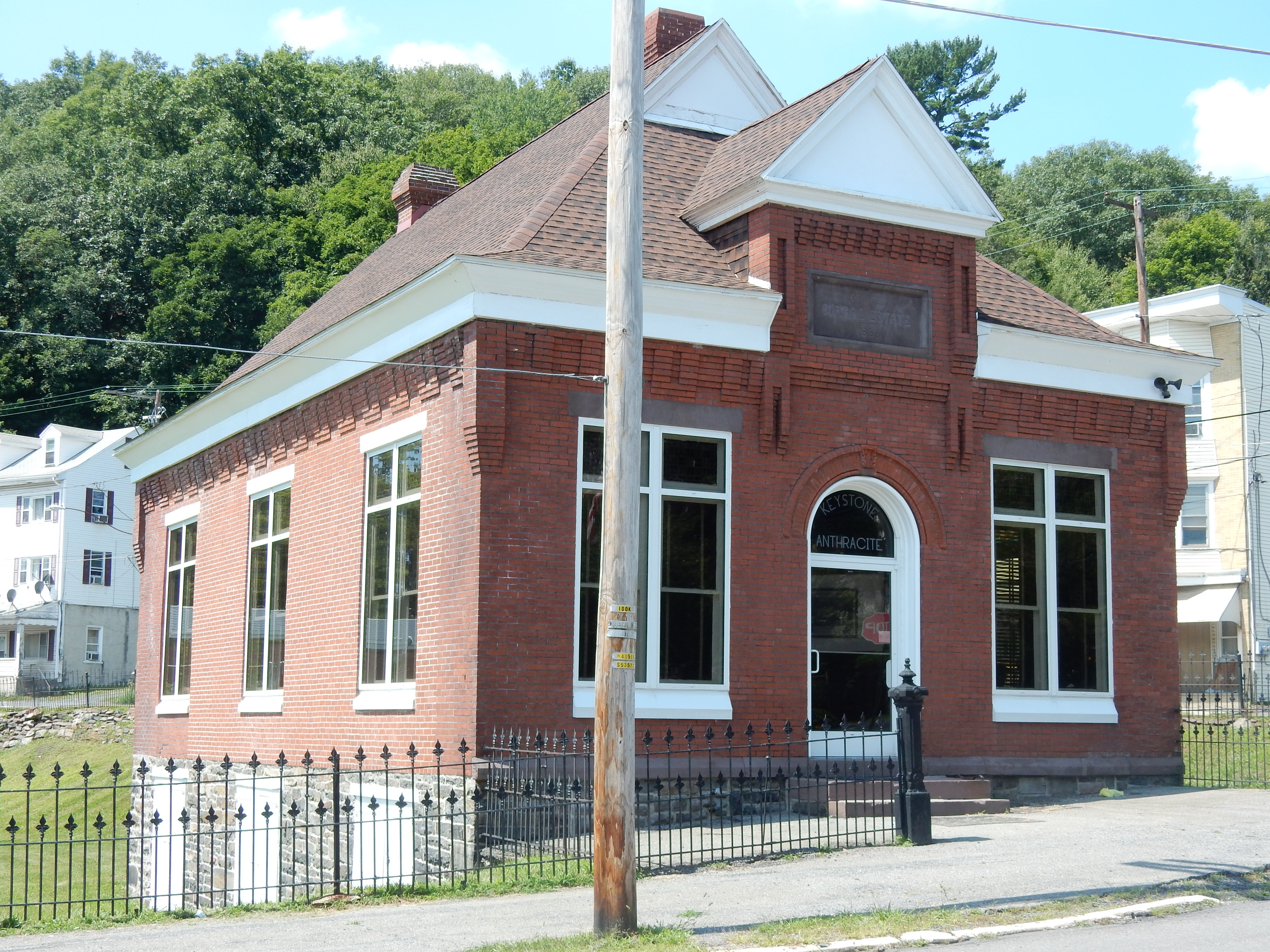
Girard Estate Office (1888)

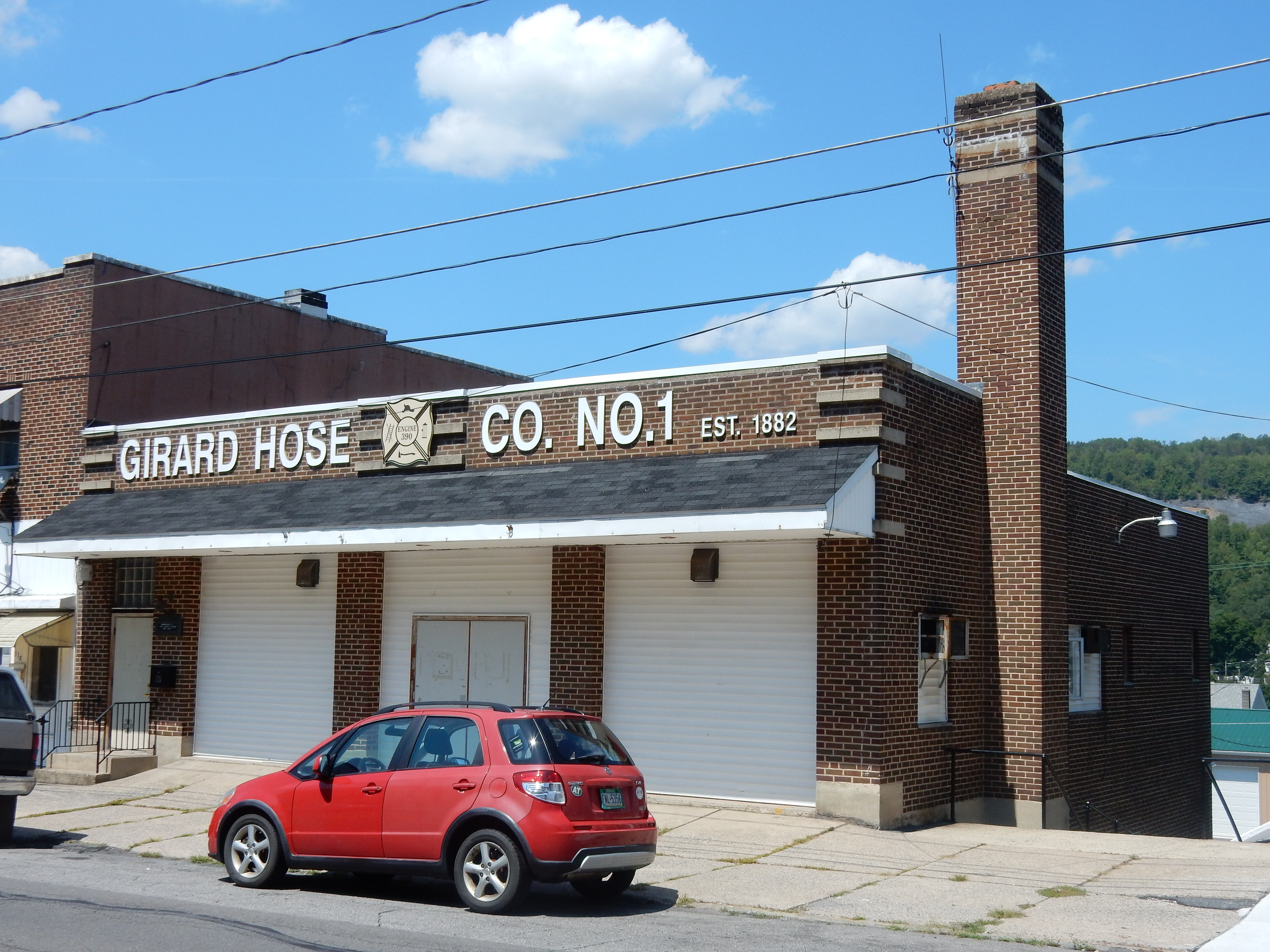
Girard Hose Co. No. 1

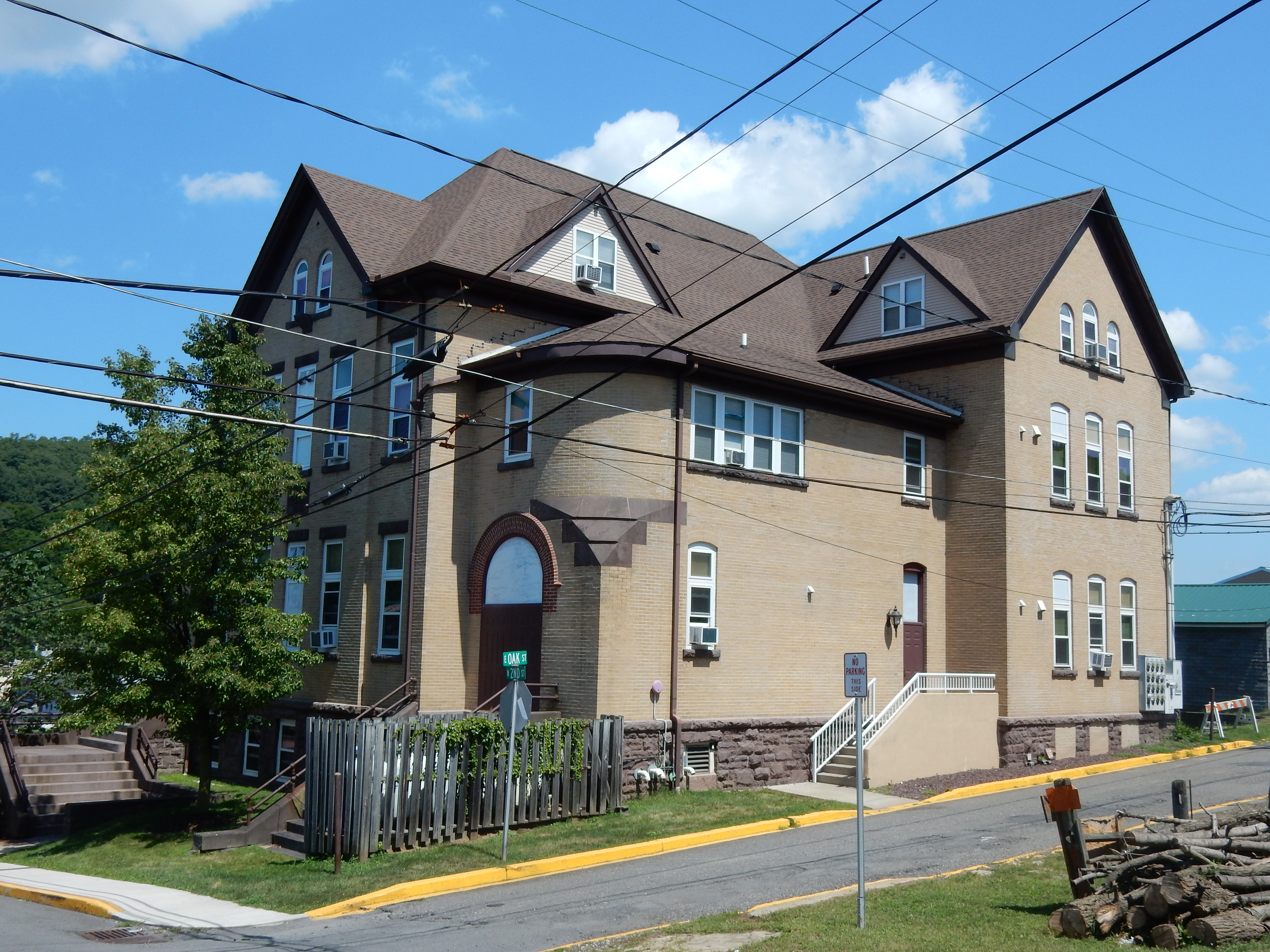
Girardville Towers

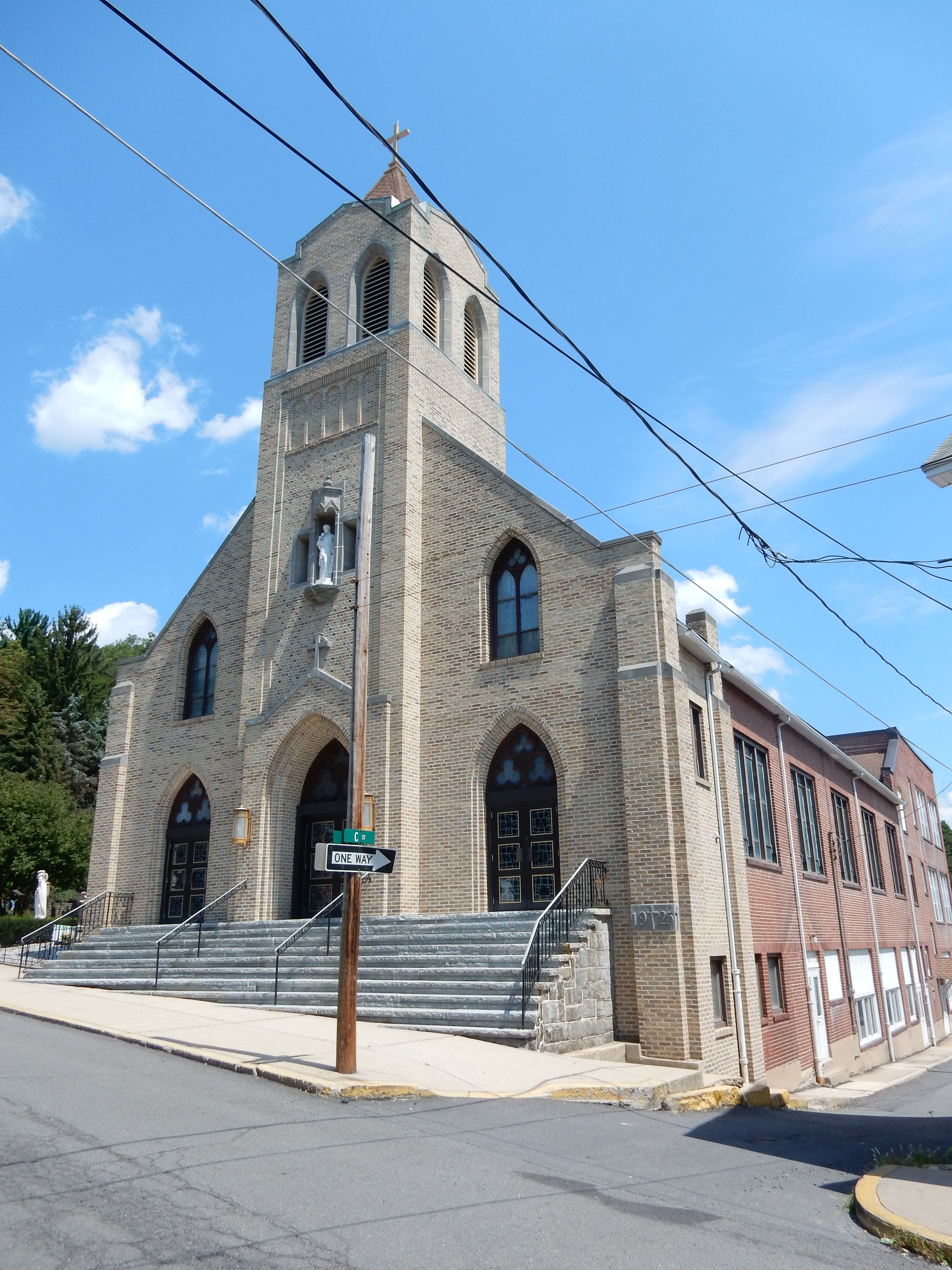
St. Vincent de Paul R.C. Church

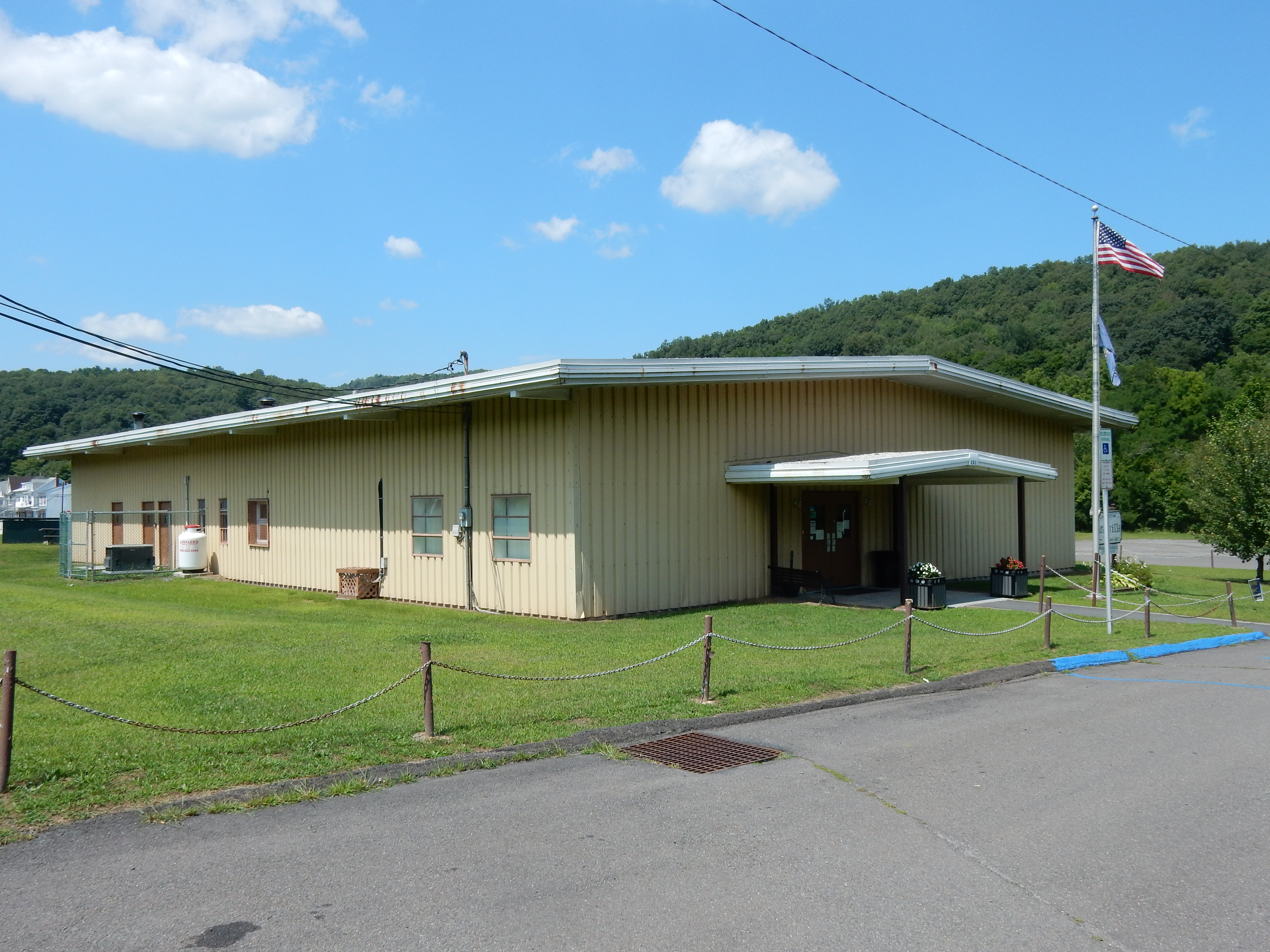
Girardville Municipal Building
