= Patrick H. Monaghan =

Patrick Henry Monaghan
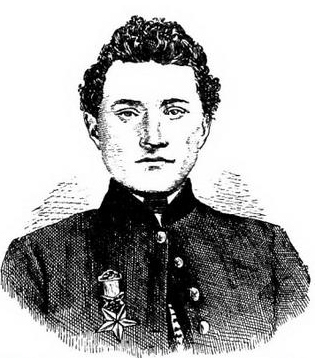
- Corp. Patrick H. Monaghan, c. 1864
- Born: November 19, 1843; Belmullet, County Mayo, Ireland
- Died: October 22, 1917 (aged 73); Girardville, Pennsylvania
- Military career
- Allegiance: United States of America
- Branch: Pennsylvania National Guard, 1872–1884; U.S. Army (Union): 48th Pennsylvania Infantry, 1861–1865
- Rank: Lieutenant colonel (Pennsylvania National Guard); Sergeant (48th Pennsylvania Infantry)
- Conflicts: American Civil War: Northern Virginia Campaign; Battle of Cedar Mountain; Second Battle of Bull Run; Battle of Chantilly; Maryland Campaign; Battle of South Mountain; Battle of Antietam; Battle of Fredericksburg; East Tennessee Campaign/Knoxville Campaign; Battle of Campbell’s Station; Siege of Knoxville; Overland Campaign; Battle of the Wilderness; Battle of Spotsylvania Court House; Battle of Cold Harbor; Siege of Petersburg; Battle of the Crater (preparations only); Battle of Poplar Springs Church
- Awards: Medal of Honor

Patrick Henry Monaghan (November 19, 1843 – October 22, 1917) was a native of Ireland who fought for the federal government of the United States (Union Army) during the American Civil War as a member of Company F of the 48th Pennsylvania Infantry. He received America's highest award for valor, the U.S. Medal of Honor, for recapturing the regimental flag of the 7th New York Heavy Artillery on June 17, 1864 while fighting in the Siege of Petersburg, Virginia.

== Formative years ==
Born on November 19, 1843, Patrick H. Monaghan was a native of Belmullet, County Mayo, Ireland. In 1848, when he was five years old, Monaghan emigrated from Ireland and, after arriving in America, settled with his family in Schuylkill County, Pennsylvania. Educated initially in the public school in Minersville, Monaghan then went on to graduate from the Normal School.

== Civil War ==
On August 12, 1861, Patrick H. Monaghan became one of the early responders to U.S. President Abraham Lincoln's call for volunteers to defend Washington, D.C. following the mid-April 1861 fall of Fort Sumter to the Confederate States Army. After enrolling for military service in the American Civil War, Monaghan officially mustered in as a private with Company F of the 48th Pennsylvania Infantry. Military records at the time described him as being an 18-year-old laborer and Schuylkill County, Pennsylvania resident who was 5’7” tall with light hair, blue eyes, and a light complexion.

Armed with Harper's Ferry muskets, Monaghan and his fellow 48th Pennsylvania Volunteers were trained in basic light infantry tactics before being shipped on September 24 to Baltimore, Maryland via the Northern Central Railroad, where they transferred to the steamship, Georgia. Transported to Fortress Monroe, they disembarked there on September 26, and resumed their training. After departing Fortress Monroe on November 11 via the steamship, S.R. Spaulding, they arrived at Hatteras Island in North Carolina the next day. Encamped in wooden barracks at Fort Clarke, Monaghan and his regiment continued to hone their skills via drills and inspections. During the early winter of 1862, they received their first exposure to combat when they participated in the capture of Roanoke Island (February 7–8, 1862). Monaghan then remained behind at their Hatteras encampment with his fellow F Company members, as well as those from Companies E and K, when the bulk of the regiment participated in operations related to the Battle of New Bern (March 14). They then reconnected with the main body of their regiment on May 23, which had been reassigned, on April 11, to the 1st Brigade of the division commanded by Brigadier-General Jesse L. Reno. At this juncture, they were then issued Enfield rifles. Moved back to Fortress Monroe in early June, they were then ordered to Newport News, Virginia where, on August 2, they sailed for Aquia Creek, and were transported from there two days later by rail to Fredericksburg, where they supported Union Army operation for roughly a week before being assigned to the Northern Virginia Campaign, during which they fought in the Battle of Cedar Mountain (August 9), engaged in operations at Kelly's Ford, White Sulphur Springs, Warrenton, and Manassas Junctions, and fought against the Confederate forces led by Stonewall Jackson in the Second Battle of Bull Run (August 28–30). According to historian Samuel P. Bates, Monaghan and his fellow 48th Pennsylvanians reached the battlefield at Bull Run at 1 p.m. on August 29 after “the action already having begun”, and were quickly positioned on the Union Army's far right:

At three it formed in line of battle, with the Second Maryland on the right, the Sixth New Hampshire on the left, and the Forty-eighth in rear of the latter, and moved a cleared field toward the dense wood occupied by the enemy. The wood was skirted by a fence, which had scarcely been passed, when his infantry opened with a brisk fire upon the advancing column. The Forty-eighth marched with the steadfastness of regulars, and when the battalions in front, obliquing to right and left, permitted to advance and occupy the intervening space, it promptly opened with telling effect, and with fixed bayonets advanced a quarter of a mile, driving him from two ditches, from one of which, an old railroad cut, a brigade had previously failed to dislodge him. Receiving a volley of musketry from the rear … Colonel Sigfried ordered it back to the nearest ditch. The fire on the Sixth New Hampshire, and Forty-eighth Pennsylvania, from front, left, and rear was most terrific. The colors were raised and spread out to the view of the supposed friends, but hotter and more deadly grew the fire. At last rebel regiments made their appearance, and when discovered were greeted with a volley from the left companies of the Forty-eighth, but their strong force, and raking cross fire compelled it to retire in front of the Excelsior Brigade, and the forces of General Kearny, which quickly advanced to the fight. The regiment lost seven killed, sixty-one wounded [including Patrick H. Monaghan], ten prisoners, and seventy-four missing, an aggregate of one hundred and fifty-two.

Re-engaging with the enemy the next day (August 30), the 48th Pennsylvanians experienced more intense combat during the Battle of Chantilly (September 1), during which the 48th Pennsylvania was again positioned at the far right of the Union Army. Ordered to Alexandria after the battle's conclusion, the regiment was reassigned to the Maryland Campaign (September 4–20). After fighting again near Fox's Pass in the Battle of South Mountain (September 14), Monaghan and the 48th Pennsylvania persevered through the brutality of the Battle of Antietam (September 17). Having engaged the enemy that morning at Burnside's Bridge, they then led the 1st Brigade in its pursuit of CSA troops through Sharpsburg and its surrounding bluffs while under heavy enemy artillery and rifle fire. Continuing to march and skirmish periodically with the enemy that fall, they then fought again in the Battle of Fredericksburg (December 11–15).

Still serving with the U.S. Army's 9th Corps during the opening months of 1863, Monaghan and the 48th Pennsylvania Infantry were transferred with their corps to duties in the west. Transported on March 26 from Newport News to Cincinnati, by way of Baltimore, Harrisburg and Pittsburgh, they spent less than 24 hours in the city on March 30 before moving on to their assigned provost duties in Lexington, Kentucky. A corporal by this point in his military career, he was subsequently attached to Battery M of the 3rd U.S. Artillery from September to December 1863, during which time he fought with the Army of the Potomac in the East Tennessee Campaign (also known as the Knoxville Campaign), including the Battle of Campbell's Station (November 16) and Siege of Knoxville.

On New Year's Day in 1864, Monaghan re-enlisted with the 48th Pennsylvania at Cincinnati, mustered in with Company F at the rank of sergeant, and was awarded a 30-day veteran's furlough.

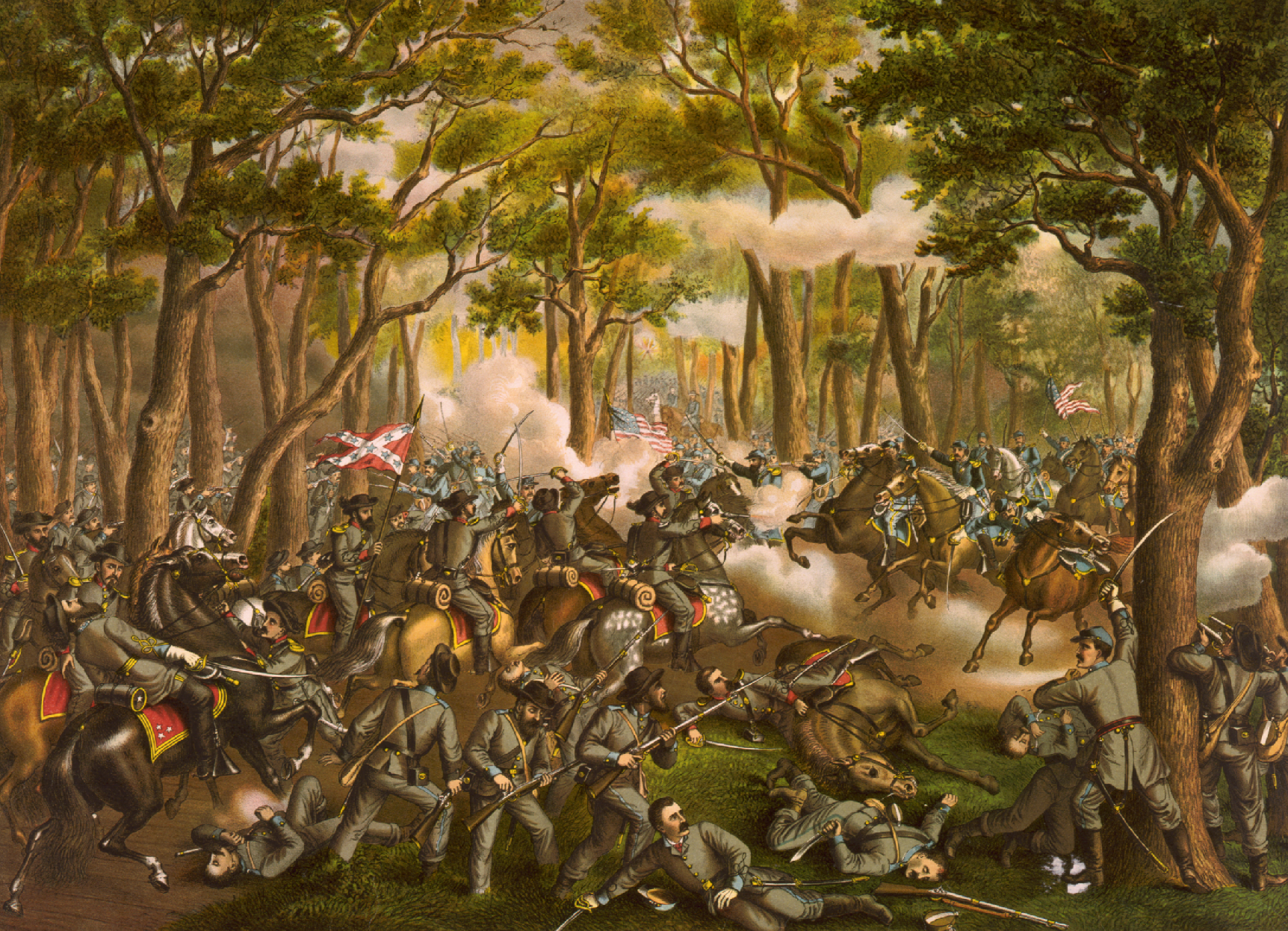
Battle of the Wilderness, Virginia, May 5–7, 1864.

Having returned to service with his regiment in February 1864, Monaghan joined his fellow 48th Pennsylvania Volunteers in their next phase of service. Attached to the 1st Brigade of the 2nd Division of the U.S. Army's 9th Corps, they were then assigned to the Overland Campaign led by Lieutenant-General Ulysses S. Grant. While re-engaging the enemy in the Battle of the Wilderness (May 5–7), Monaghan was wounded again. The 48th Pennsylvania was then even more heavily battered by the enemy during the Battle of Spotsylvania Court House (May 8–21), a fight in which the 48th “steadily maintained its position under a destructive fire of musketry and artillery, and captured two hundred prisoners” that morning, according to Bates, and charged the enemy that afternoon “under a galling fire” that felled multiple members of the regiment. After charging the enemy again on the 18th, they then skirmished off and on with Confederate troops in the vicinities of the North Anna and Pamunkey rivers and Totopotomoy Creek before fully re-engaging with the enemy during the Battle of Cold Harbor (June 3–12).

It was during his regiment's next phase of duty that Monaghan performed the act of valor for which he would later be awarded the U.S. Medal of Honor. In recalling the events later for author Theophilus F. Rodenbough, Monaghan said:

After crossing the James River on the 15th of June, we marched rapidly toward Petersburg, and on the evening of the 16th debouched from a dense strip of woods, deployed, and double-quicked across a field toward the enemy’s works. On our approach, a brigade of the Second Corps, which occupied a hastily constructed breastwork in front, advanced to carry the enemy’s works. But after a desperate attempt to storm them, they were repulsed with severe loss, especially in prisoners. It was then that the New York regiment lost its colors. This was late on the evening of the 16th. During the night we manoeuvered, crossing a marsh that intervened in single file, and took position closer to the rebel works. While in this position the most profound silence was maintained, as we could hear the enemy talking, and every man was notified to secure his tin cup and trappings so as to make no noise and be ready for a charge. Before daylight the order came, and we, with the 36th Massachusetts, dashed forward, under a heavy fire, leaped the enemy’s breastworks, capturing four pieces of artillery, six hundred prisoners, and about a thousand stand of arms.

In leaping the breastworks, a rebel fired, with his gun so close to the left side of my head that my hair was singed, my cheek slightly burned, and ear injured by the concussion so that I feel the effects of it yet. Thomas James, a comrade of mine, knocked a rebel down with his gun, and Isaac Lewis (another comrade) and a rebel fired at each other, killing each other instantly. It was short, sharp work and we lost seventy-five men. The enemy fell back in confusion toward their second line, while our troops occupied the one just taken. A few of us — a strong skirmish line as it were — without orders, pursued them. Between the line just taken and the next, the ground was undulating, and a small stream of water flowed in a hollow thus formed. A growth of small trees and underbrush lined either bank of this stream. A part of the enemy made a stand here and delivered fire. As we dashed forward, firing as we went, a young man, whom I took for an officer, came towards us, with a handkerchief fastened to a rod, reached it to me and said he wished to surrender…. I directed him to the rear — the line just captured and held by our troops — and ran to the edge of the woods and fired. A man fell across the small stream with his head almost in the water, and immediately a tall rebel, who was near, threw down his gun, ran forward, caught him, sat on the bank with his feet in the water, and placed the head of the wounded man [a major from a Tennessee regiment] in his lap…. I stepped a few paces to the left in search of a stretcher, when a rebel, with a gun at a trail and a flag over his shoulder came running toward me. When he saw me he attempted to use his piece, but I had him covered, and shouted to him to drop his gun and surrender. He dropped it, and I ran forward and took the colors from him.

I was so elated over getting those colors that I merely called to the prisoners to follow me, and not knowing whether they did or not, ran excitedly back to the line which was still firing over us, who were in the hollow, at the retreating rebels beyond the thicket. I fortunately approached my own company, who upon seeing me ceased firing, set up a cheer, while I leaped upon the breastworks and waved the flag. Lieut. John L. Williams, of our company, jumped up, embraced me, and the boys pulled us both down, as the enemy had opened a pretty lively fire from their second line by this time. We unfurled the flag and found it belonged to the 7th New York Heavy Artillery.

Involved with his regiment in the June and July preparations for the mine placement and explosion at Petersburg, but not the ensuing Battle of the Crater (July 30), Monaghan and his fellow 48th Pennsylvanians next fought with Confederates in the Battle of Poplar Springs Church (September 30–October 2), and were then reassigned to the occupation of Fort Sedgwick from early December 1864 through April 1, 1865. The next day, they participated in the Union's assault on Fort Mahone, and began the occupation of Petersburg (April 3), continuing in operations related to this action until their regiment was honorably mustered out on July 17, 1865.

== Post-war life ==
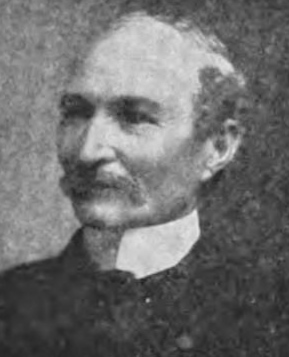
Patrick H. Monaghan, c. 1907.

Following his return to Pottsville, Pennsylvania with his regiment, Monaghan married Bridget Derrick circa 1870. A fellow County Mayo resident, she had emigrated circa 1849. Initially making their home in Minersville and then, by 1880, in Girardville, their children were: William J. (born c. 1871), Mary B. (born November 1874), Joseph P. (born January 1876), Margaret M. (born January 1879), Vincent (c. 1884–1920), who was born in July 1884, and Helen (born May 1886). A teacher in the Schuylkill County public schools from 1873 to 1916, Monaghan was also appointed to the post of superintendent of the school system in Girardville, a position he continued to hold from the early 1880s until August 20, 1909 when he was moved by his school board into an elementary school principal's position, according to The Philadelphia Inquirer:

SHENANDOAH, Pa., Aug. 20.— At a meeting of the Girardville School Board, Colonel P. H. Monaghan, for thirty years principal of the Girardville schools, was demoted and given a position In a grammar school. Colonel Monaghan is regarded as one of the best educators in this section and a public speaker and lecturer of note. Political antagonists opposed the re-election of Mr. Monaghan to the principalship.

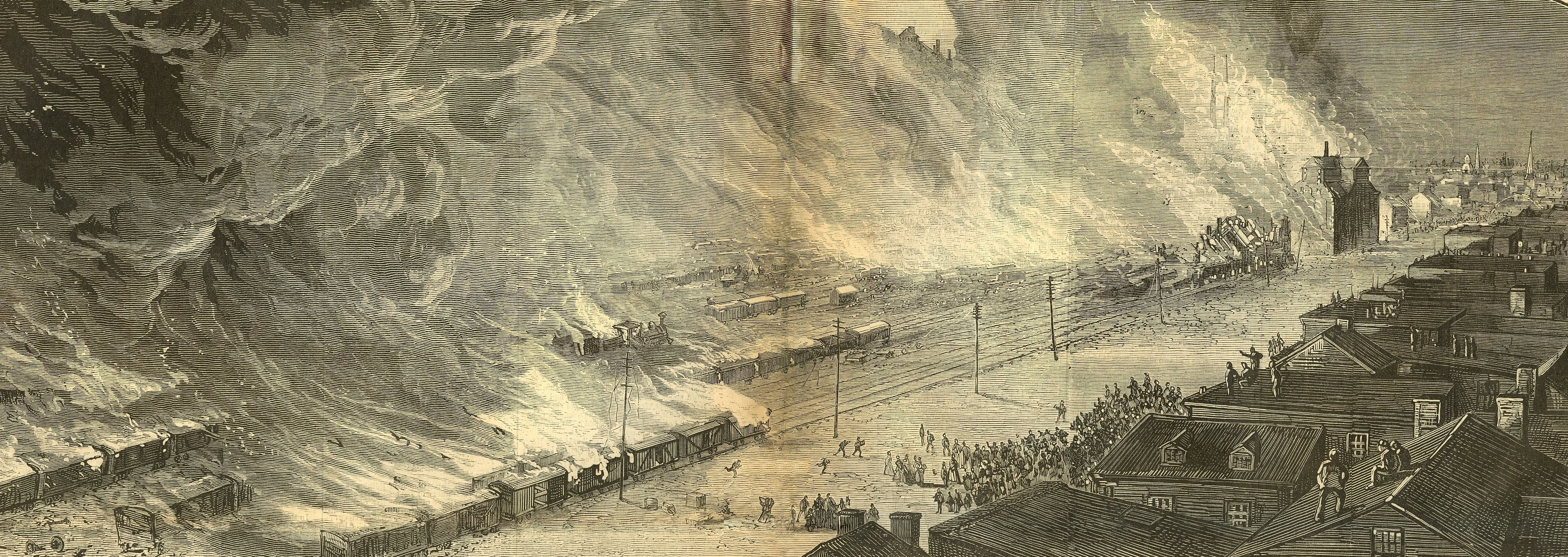
Burning of trains by rioters during the Great Railroad Strike of 1877, Pittsburgh (Harper's Weekly, August 1877).

In addition, Monaghan enrolled for post-war service with the National Guard of Pennsylvania. After initially mustering in as a captain with the guard's 7th Regiment on July 24, 1872, he was recommissioned at the rank of major on August 5, 1879, and then recommissioned again as a lieutenant colonel on July 15, 1880. During his tenure of service, Monaghan and his subordinates were called upon to restore order in Shenandoah during the labor riots of 1875, provided police support for the 1876 Centennial Exposition in Philadelphia, and were then called upon to restore order again during the Great Railroad Strike of 1877. Initially stationed in Harrisburg in July of that year, they were then reassigned to Pittsburgh in August until they were relieved by another regiment of the Pennsylvania National Guard.

A naturalized citizen of the United States by the time of the 1900 federal census, Monaghan continued to reside in Girardville with his wife and children: Mary; Joseph, who was studying law; Margaret; Vincent, who had become a druggist's clerk; and Helen. That fall, he presented a lecture on the topic of “The Rank and File” during his former Civil War regiment's annual reunion in Pottsville. He then also attended the group's reunion in 1905, and was photographed wearing his MoH at a Girardville Veteran's reunion in 1913.

Still residing together with his wife and all of his surviving children by 1910, Monaghan continued to serve his community, as did sons William J. and Vincent D., who had become, respectively, a doctor and pharmacist.

== Death and interment ==
Monaghan died in Girardville, Pennsylvania on October 22, 1917, and was buried at Saint Joseph's Cemetery in Girardville.

== Medal of Honor citation and other awards ==
Rank and organization: Corporal, Company F, 48th Pennsylvania Infantry. Born Ireland: Entered service at: Minersville, Pa. Place and date: At Petersburg, Va., June 17, 1864. Date of issue: December 1, 1864. Citation:

The President of the United States of America, in the name of Congress, takes pleasure in presenting the Medal of Honor to Corporal Patrick H. Monaghan, United States Army, for extraordinary heroism on June 17, 1864, while serving with Company F, 48th Pennsylvania Infantry, in action at Petersburg, Virginia, for recapture of colors of the 7th New York Heavy Artillery.

In 1939, Monaghan's adopted hometown honored his service to his nation, state and community with the unveiling on Memorial Day of a bronze plaque outside of the new auditorium at the Girardville high school.

== See also ==
- Infantry Tactics
- Irish Americans in the American Civil War
- List of American Civil War Medal of Honor recipients: M–P
- Pennsylvania in the American Civil War
