= James Nagle (general) =

United States/Union Army general

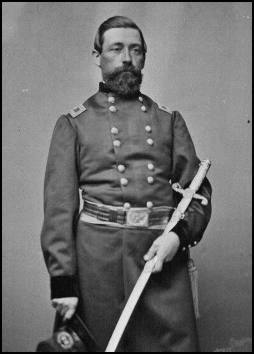
- James Nagle
- Born: April 5, 1822; Reading, Pennsylvania
- Died: August 22, 1866 (aged 44); Pottsville, Pennsylvania
- Burial place: Presbyterian Cemetery, Pottsville, Pennsylvania
- Military career
- Allegiance: United States of America; Union
- Branch: United States Army; Union Army
- Service years: 1846–1848; 1861–1864
- Rank: Brigadier General
- Unit: Army of the Potomac
- Commands: 1st Brigade, 2nd Division, IX Corps; 48th Pennsylvania Volunteer Infantry Regiment
- Conflicts: Mexican–American War; American Civil War
- Other work: painter, paper hanger, sheriff

James Nagle (April 5, 1822 – August 22, 1866) was an officer in the United States Army in both the Mexican–American War and the American Civil War. During the latter conflict, he recruited and commanded four infantry regiments from the commonwealth of Pennsylvania and led two different brigades in the Eastern Theater. As the war progressed, worsening health problems precluded prolonged field service, but Nagle is perhaps best known for his actions at the 1862 Battle of Antietam, where his brigade played a key role in securing Burnside's Bridge, a key crossing over the contested Antietam Creek.

== Early life and career ==
Nagle was born in Reading, Pennsylvania, as the eldest of eight children born and raised by Daniel and Mary Nagle. His grandfather had been a drummer in the Continental Army during the American Revolutionary War. His family moved several times when he was a child, finally settling in 1835 in Pottsville, Pennsylvania, where in 1842 he organized what became the Washington Artillery Company. He learned the trades of paperhanger and painter from his father.

When war was declared against Mexico a few years later, he enlisted with his men as Company B of the 1st Pennsylvania Volunteers. His regiment was stationed at the Perote Castle to keep open the communication with Veracruz during its siege. He assisted in routing a force of guerillas at La Hoya, fought at Huamantla, Puebla, and Atlixco, entered the city of Mexico, and was finally stationed at San Ángel until the close of the war. He was mustered out of service with his company at Philadelphia on July 27, 1848, and the inhabitants of Schuylkill County, Pennsylvania, presented him with a commemorative silver and gold-plated sword.

Nagle subsequently resumed his business as a painter and paperhanger. In 1852, he was elected as the sheriff of Schuylkill County, a post he would occupy until war erupted in 1861. Also in 1852, Nagle married Elizabeth Kaercher, who bore nine children, seven of which lived to maturity. He was also on the Pottsville School Board, and was a member and then president of the borough council.

== Civil War service ==
In 1861, following the outbreak of the Civil War, Nagle was commissioned as the colonel of the 6th Pennsylvania Infantry, a regiment with a three-month term of enlistment. Later that year, after his regiment mustered out of the service, he organized the three-years' 48th Pennsylvania Volunteer Infantry Regiment, of which he was made colonel. Among his men were four of his brothers, as well as much of the current membership of his old Washington Artillery. Nagle initially served at Fort Monroe in Virginia, and then in Hatteras Island and Newbern in North Carolina. On April 23, 1862, he was assigned command of the 1st Brigade of Maj. Gen. Jesse Reno's 2nd Division of the Department of North Carolina.

Nagle commanded his brigade (now in the IX Corps under Reno) in the Second Battle of Bull Run. He was appointed brigadier general of volunteers on September 10, 1862, and at Antietam his brigade performed an important part in carrying what later became known as Burnside's Bridge, which, according to army commander George B. McClellan, saved the day.

Nagle's appointment expired on March 4, 1863, but was renewed nine days later and he served with his brigade in Kentucky until May 9, when he resigned due to impaired health (he suffered from heart disease). He returned home to recuperate. When General Robert E. Lee invaded Pennsylvania in June 1863, Nagle organized the 39th Pennsylvania Volunteer Militia and was commissioned its colonel by Governor Andrew Curtin. He subsequently commanded a brigade of emergency militia, and was mustered out on August 2, 1863, following the end of the Gettysburg campaign and the retreat of Lee's army into Virginia.

In 1864, he organized the 149th Pennsylvania Infantry for 100 days' service, became its colonel, and guarded the approaches to Baltimore, Maryland, until the expiration of his service.

== Postbellum ==
After the war, Nagle resumed civilian life, but was in poor health from his ailing heart and liver. He died in 1866 at his Pottsville home, surrounded by his family. His well-attended funeral was held on August 25, and he was buried in Pottsville's Presbyterian Cemetery.

He is honored with a statue on the 48th Pennsylvania's monument on the Antietam Battlefield near Sharpsburg, Maryland.

== See also ==
- List of American Civil War generals (Union)
