= 48th Pennsylvania Infantry Regiment =

48th Regiment Pennsylvania Volunteer Infantry
- Active: September 1861 – July 17th, 1865
- Country: United States
- Allegiance: Union
- Branch: Infantry
- Nickname: Schuylkill Regiment
- Engagements: Battle of New Bern; Battle of Second Bull Run; Battle of Chantilly; Battle of South Mountain; Battle of Antietam; Battle of Fredericksburg; Battle of Blue Springs; Battle of Campbell's Station; Siege of Knoxville; Battle of the Wilderness; Battle of Spotsylvania Court House; Battle of North Anna; Battle of Totopotomoy Creek; Battle of Cold Harbor; Siege of Petersburg; Battle of the Crater; Battle of Globe Tavern; Battle of Peebles's Farm; Battle of Boydton Plank Road

Insignia
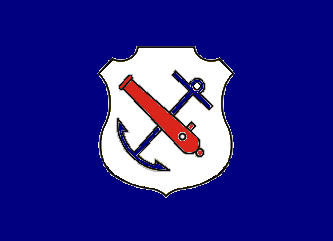
- 2nd Division, IX Corps

The 48th Regiment Pennsylvania Volunteer Infantry, the "Schuylkill Regiment", was an infantry regiment of the Union Army during the American Civil War.

== Service ==
The 48th Pennsylvania Infantry was recruited in Schuylkill County, Pennsylvania and organized at Camp Curtin in Harrisburg, Pennsylvania, during August and September 1861. It was mustered into federal service there, by detachments, in mid-September. Many members of the regiment had seen prior service in at least three Pennsylvania units which had seen service as 'three-month term of enlistment' organizations - the 6th, 14th, and 25th Pennsylvania Infantry regiments. A large number of men in the regiment had been miners prior to the war.

Initially equipped with smoothbore muskets which had been converted from flintlock to percussion, the regiment was then re-equipped with Enfield rifles in May 1862.

The regiment first saw action on March 14, 1862, when six of its companies took part in the Battle of New Bern, North Carolina. The remainder of the regiment arrived in the area on May 23. The unit then moved to Fort Monroe, Virginia, July 6–8, and on to Fredericksburg August 2–4. At Culpeper, Virginia, on August 13, the 48th Pennsylvania joined the Army of Virginia under General John Pope. It spent the next few weeks participating in the Northern Virginia Campaign, seeing action at the Second Battle of Bull Run (August 29–30) and the Battle of Chantilly (September 1). The Maryland Campaign followed through September and the unit took park in the Battles of South Mountain (September 14) and Antietam (September 16–17).

On September 17, 1862, at Antietam, the 48th Pennsylvania's brigade assisted in carrying Burnside's Bridge, and crossed it soon after 1:00 PM. After the repulse of three divisions later in the day, two brigades advanced to the crest of the ridge to check Confederate pursuit. The 48th Pennsylvania supported and relieved the 51st Pennsylvania, engaging the Confederates posted on the line and behind the stone walls right and left of that point. The engagement continued into the night, and the regiment and brigade bivouacked on the ground on which they had fought.

Following Antietam, the 48th Pennsylvania camped at Pleasant Valley, Maryland, until October 27. The unit moved to Falmouth, Virginia, October 27 – November 17, and on to Corbin's Cross Roads near Amissville on November 10. The Battle of Fredericksburg followed from December 12 to 15, and then an aborted campaign on January 20–24, 1863, known as the Mud March.

The 48th Pennsylvania served at Falmouth, Virginia, until February 19, 1863, then moved to Newport News, and on to Covington, Kentucky, March 26–April 1. Provost and guard duty at Lexington, Kentucky, followed until September 10. After transferring to Knoxville, where the unit stayed until October 4, it took part in the Knoxville Campaign and saw action at the Battle of Blue Springs (October 10), Battle of Campbell's Station (November 16), siege of Knoxville (November 17–December 5), and the pursuit of Confederate General James Longstreet (December 5–29). The regiment re-enlisted at Blain's Cross Road on December 7 and the men were given a veterans' furlough through March 1864.

Reuniting at Pottsville, Pennsylvania, the unit left Pennsylvania on March 14 and was at Annapolis, Maryland, until April. Seeing heavy action in the Overland Campaign, the regiment participated in the Battles of the Wilderness (May 5–7), Spotsylvania Court House (May 8–12), Stannard's Mills (May 21), North Anna (May 23–26), Line of the Pamunkey, (May 26–28), Totopotomoy Creek (May 28–31), Cold Harbor (June 1–12), and Bethesda Church (June 1–3).

=== Siege of Petersburg ===
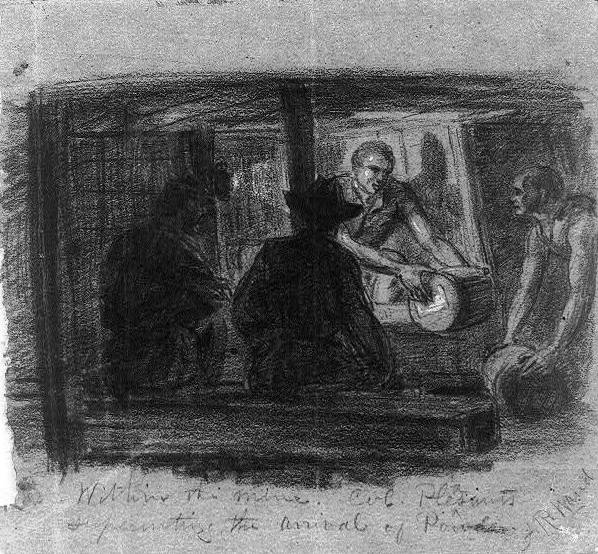
Sketch of Col. Pleasants supervising the placement of powder in the mine by Alfred Waud.

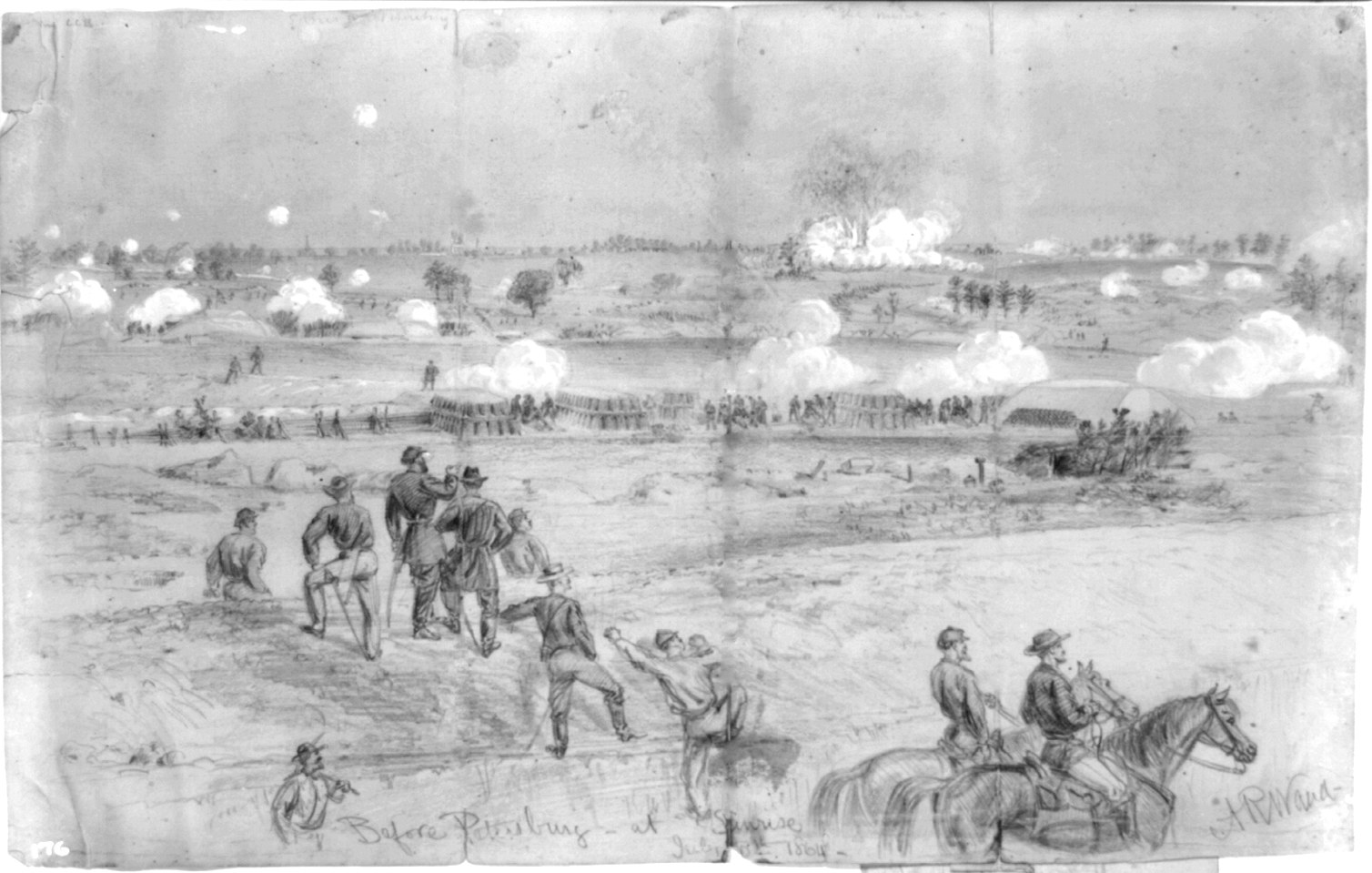
Sketch of the explosion seen from the Union line by Alfred Waud.

The 48th Pennsylvania served in the Siege of Petersburg from June 16, 1864, to April 2, 1865, including the Second Battle of Petersburg on June 16–18 and the Battle of Jerusalem Plank Road on June 22–23. At the Second Battle of Petersburg, two soldiers of the regiment earned the Medal of Honor: Private Robert Reid of Company G for capturing a Confederate battle flag, and Corporal Patrick H. Monaghan of Company F for re-capturing a Union battle flag.

The 48th Pennsylvania then played an integral role in what would become known as the Battle of the Crater on July 30, 1864. In mid-1864, Grant wanted to defeat Lee's army at Petersburg without resorting to a lengthy siege—his experience in the Siege of Vicksburg told him that such affairs were expensive and difficult on the morale of his men. Lieutenant Colonel Henry Pleasants, commanding the 48th Pennsylvania Infantry of Major General Ambrose Burnside's IX Corps, offered a novel proposal to solve Grant's problem. Pleasants, a mining engineer from Pennsylvania in civilian life, proposed digging a long mine shaft underneath the Confederate lines and planting explosive charges directly underneath a fort (Elliott's Salient) in the middle of the Confederate First Corps line. If successful, Union troops could drive through the resulting gap in the line into the Confederate rear area. Digging began in late June, creating a mine in a "T" shape with an approach shaft 511 feet (156 m) long. At its end, a perpendicular gallery of 75 feet (23 m) extended in both directions. The gallery was filled with 8,000 pounds of gunpowder, buried 20 feet (6.1 m) underneath the Confederate works.

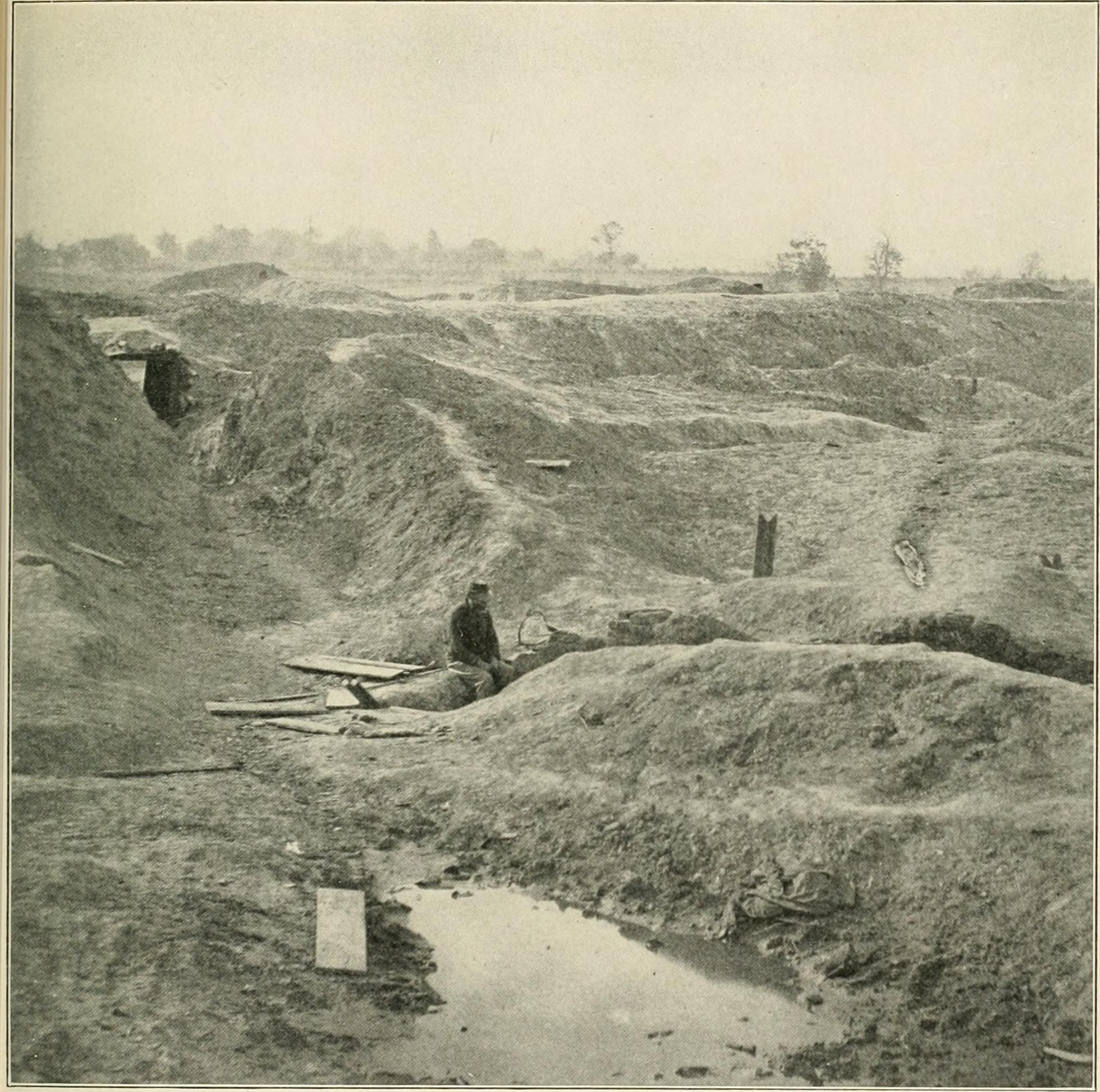
Result of the explosion

At 4:44 a.m. on July 30, the charges exploded in a massive shower of earth, men, and guns. A crater (still visible today) was created, 170 feet (52 m) long, 60 to 80 feet (24 m) wide, and 30 feet (9.1 m) deep. The blast destroyed the Confederate fortifications in the immediate vicinity, and instantly killed between 250 and 350 Confederate soldiers.

The 48th Pennsylvania participated in several further battles of the Petersburg campaign in 1864: Globe Tavern (August 18–21), Peebles's Farm (September 29–October 2), and Boydton Plank Road (October 27–28). At the Third Battle of Petersburg on April 2, 1865, regimental Surgeon William R. D. Blackwood removed wounded comrades from the battlefield under heavy fire, for which he was later awarded the Medal of Honor. After occupying the city of Petersburg, the unit marched to Farmville, Virginia, on April 3–9. The 48th Pennsylvania returned to the Petersburg and City Point area on April 20–24, then moved on to Alexandria, Virginia, on April 26–28.

Following the end of the war, the regiment took part in the Grand Review of the Armies in Washington, D.C., on May 23. The unit served at Washington and Alexandria until being mustered out on July 17, 1865. A monument was erected by the Commonwealth of Pennsylvania in Branch Avenue, Antietam Battlefield, MD to commemorate the services of the 48th Regiment, Pennsylvania Veteran volunteers and it was dedicated on September 17, 1904. Survivors of the 48th Regiment attended the dedication. Another monument was built and paid for by the 48th Regiment Pennsylvania Veteran Association and given to the state of Virginia. The monument was dedicated on June 20, 1907, in Richmond, Virginia.[Story of the Forty-Eighth by Joseph Gould]

== Total strength and casualties ==
Eight hundred and fifty-eight officers and enlisted men were mustered into service as members of the regiment, of whom 11 officers and 145 enlisted men were killed and mortally wounded and 3 officers and 142 enlisted men died by disease, for a total of 301 deaths.

== Commanders ==
- Colonel James Nagle
- Colonel Joshua K. Sigfried
- Colonel George Washington Gowen
- Lt. Col. Henry Pleasants

== See also ==
- List of Pennsylvania Civil War regiments
