= Instrumentally Yours =

Studio album by Grady Martin
- Released: 1965
- Genre: Countrypolitan
- Length: 29:53
- Label: Decca

Professional ratings
Review scores
Source	Rating
Billboard	4/4 stars

Instrumentally Yours is a studio album released by guitarist Grady Martin in 1965 on Decca LP record DL 74610 (stereo) and DL 4610 (mono). The album was also issued, in truncated format, on a 7-inch "Little LP" mini-album for Seeburg jukeboxes. Included is a version of "El Paso", for which Martin had provided distinctive guitar for Marty Robbins' hit.

== Track listing ==
=== Side one ===
1. "El Paso"^{1} (Marty Robbins) – 2:36
2. "Theme from Malamondo ("Funny World")" (Ennio Morricone) – 2:21
3. "The Girl from Ipanema" (Antonio Carlos Jobim - Vinicius de Moras) – 2:48
4. "All Alone Am I" (Manos Hadjidakis - Arthur Altman) – 2:32
5. "Ramona"^{1} (Mabel Wayne - Louis Wolfe Gilbert) – 2:40
6. "Ruby" (Heinz Roemhild - Mitchell Parish) – 2:45

=== Side two ===
1. "Ring of Fire"^{1} (June Carter - Merle Kilgore) – 2:32
2. "Where Have All the Flowers Gone?" (Pete Seeger) – 2:15
3. "Near You" (Francis Craig - Kermit Goell) – 2:23
4. "Devil Woman"^{1} (Marty Robbins) – 2:30
5. "Forever"^{1} (Buddy Killen) – 2:27
6. "On the Rebound"^{1} (Floyd Cramer) – 2:04

(1) contained on Seeburg Little LP
