= S.R. Henry =

American composer

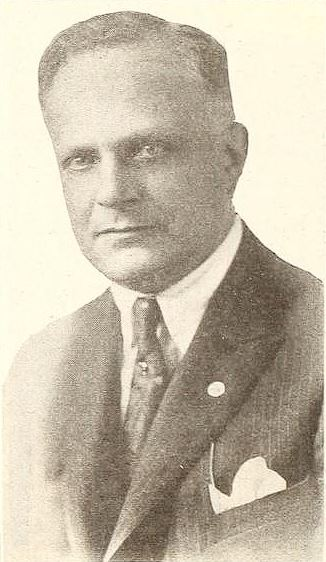
Portrait of composer S.R. Henry, taken 1919

S.R. Henry (1874-1966), was an American composer of popular music, including marches and ragtime songs during the first half of the 20th century. His best known works included "The Colored Major", "S.R. Henry's Barn Dance", "By Heck" and "Indianola". He was later known as a theatre producer and musical contributor in New York City.

== Early life and education ==
Henry (birth name, Henry Robert Stern) was born on June 23, 1874 in New York City, the younger son of Theresa Katz and Charles Stern, both German-American immigrants. He was raised in his father's necktie manufacturing business, along with his siblings Joseph and Hattie. Henry's musical education was sought in public school, and later at City College of New York and Columbia University. He received a Bachelor of Philosophy from Columbia in 1896.

== Career ==
Following in the footsteps of his older brother, Joseph, as a publisher of music and salesman with lyricist Edward B. Marks, Henry began to publish his own compositions in the late 1890s. He adopted the title 'S.R. Henry' for his published works. One of his first known publications was "I'll Be Your Friend Just the Same" with The Lyceum Publishing Co. in 1899.

His first well known piece was the march and two-step, "The Colored Major", published in 1900. This march was widely recorded in the early stages of the Victor Talking Machine Co. and competitor, Columbia Records. It was notably recorded by banjoist Sylvester "Vess" Ossman in 1901. It would be recorded by many other banjo players of the era, and remain a popular ragtime reception and concert piece in the United States and Canada in the early 1900s.

Briefly from 1901-1902, Henry could be found at 23 Union Square East and 111 East 14th Street in Manhattan with the General Music Supply Co., a manufacturer of piano rolls.

By 1903, Henry was an established tin pan alley composer of songs and instrumental pieces. He was also an active member of his brother's music publishing company, J.W. Stern & Co., which would see large financial gains by 1910. He was later employed by the Landay Brothers music store on 5th Avenue, while still being associated with the Stern firm. Henry made acquaintance with lyricist and future mayor of New York city, James J. Walker, also during this time. They contributed roles of lyric writing as well as arranging for "After they Gather the Hay" and others from 1906 to 1907.

In 1908, he published "S.R. Henry's Barn Dance", characteristic of the popular 'barn dance' tradition of rural America, or the schottische. This piece was widely performed by concert bands in America. It also saw success in sheet music sales and phonograph records. A popular recording was made in 1909 by the New York Military Band for Edison Records. A modified version with additional lyrics by Monroe H. Rosenfeld was also recorded for Edison in 1909 by vocal duo Collins & Harlan titled "Down at the Huskin' Bee". It was re-recorded in 1990 by Australian folk historian Vida Berg, and later released by the National Library of Australia on the CD album, Picking Up The Threads: Australian Women's Folk Music, as a notable piece of folk music. Henry would publish a similar popular piece of the 'barn dance' character in 1915, titled "By Heck", which was widely recorded by concert bands in the 1910s, and re-published in 1924 with lyrics by L. Wolfe Gilbert. It was revived in 1934 with an arrangement by the Dorsey Brothers Orchestra, and in 1950 with revised lyrics by Gilbert, during a royalties dispute between Stern and the lyricist.

Another relative song hit for Henry was in 1910 with the publication and recording of "I've Got the Time, I've Got the Place, but It's Hard to Find the Girl", with lyrics by Ballard MacDonald. It was notably introduced by English entertainer Hetty King, who was featured on the published sheet music cover. It was also featured by Broadway vocalists, including Frank Coombs, who sung the ballad at the 1910 Actors' Fund Fair in New York City. The song was recorded by American tenors, Byron G. Harlan and Henry Burr, among others. It was later revived by Guy Lombardo and His Royal Canadians.

Later hits for Stern included 1917's "Indianola", which was popularized by the early jazz bands of Wilbur Sweatman and James Reese Europe, and the novelty tune, "Pahjamah", in 1919. The latter was featured by many circus companies in the 20th century, including the Ringling Bros. and Barnum & Bailey circus, and was reproduced on music rolls for band organs.

From 1917 to the early 1920s, S.R. Henry had a composing partnership with fellow composer and conductor Domenico Savino, who orchestrated a number of their collaborations.

== Theatre ==
Still active at his brother's publishing firm in the 1910s, Henry entered into association with Broadway, co-founding the International Theatrical Play Bureau on West 38th Street in Manhattan circa 1916. He was director of the Bureau by 1917, helping to promote Broadway productions with the Shuberts, among others. Henry notably promoted a young George Kaufman in the 1910s, after forming an organization to promote young playwrights. He attempted to sell one of Kaufman's first plays, "Going Up", to producers. Stern was also credited for encouraging a young Richard Rodgers to pursue a career in music.

Stern contributed to his first musical in 1920, collaborating with Edward Clark and composer M. Savin on Little Miss Charity, played at the Belmont Theatre. Later in 1934, he produced John C. Brownell's play, Brain Sweat.

Variety Magazine noted in 1921, the early success of the International Theatrical Play Bureau before World War I, to collect and distribute the works of European theatrical authors in America, as opposed to a competitor, the United Plays Company. Henry would continue to collect theatrical music abroad in the following years, one example being "My Electric Girl" by Otto Helmburgh-Holmes, revised and re-published by Henry in 1923.

== Later career ==
The J.W. Stern & Co. and its associate, the International Theatrical Play Bureau, were sold in 1920 to co-founder, Edward B. Marks, at the retirement of Stern's brother, Joseph. Henry Stern announced his retirement from music publishing that same year, but would remain active in theatre involvements in New York in the 1920s. Joseph and Henry Stern would conceive of a second publishing firm to be run solely by the brothers in 1921, but this plan did not manifest. It was reported in 1930 that Henry would return to publishing music independently.

He was recorded by The Film Daily as one of many composers who "contemplate devoting their talents to the motion picture industry" in 1930, and "now associated with motion pictures", in 1931.

By 1941, Henry had removed to Dallas, Texas with his wife, where he published very little known music. His last known composition was "A Prayer in My Heart", left unpublished in 1951.

== Death and legacy ==
Henry Robert Stern died at his apartment residence at the former Highlander Hotel in Dallas on March 13, 1966.

Stern wrote the official song of and was a donor to the Bedford Boys Ranch of Bedford, Texas, in association with the Variety Clubs of Texas, which provided food, housing and recreation for boys who were wards of the court until 1957. Today, it is Boys Ranch Park, a public park in Bedford.

A number of Stern's compositions continue to be re-recorded and played at circuses and theme parks, such as his "T.P.G. Barn Dance" at Tokyo Disneyland's World Bazzar.

== Compositions ==
- I'll Be Your Friend Just the Same (1899)
- Somnambulistic Sarah (1900), march and two-step for violin
- The Colored Major (1900)
- Don't Forget the Girl that Loves You (1900), words by M.B. Edwards
- The Crack O' the Whip (1901)
- The Jolly Friars (1901)
- Lindoo, My Hindoo-Queen (1902)
- Echoes from the South (1902)
- The Fashion Show (1903), march and two-step
- The Colored Ragamuffins (1903)
- I Have Lost You, Still I Love You (1904)
- On the Pillows of Despair (1904)
- When the Harvest Moon is Shining on the River (1904)
- Polly Prim (1904), also published with lyrics by Monroe H. Rosenfeld
- Peter Piper (1905)
- Priscilla: Colonial Intermezzo (1905)
- In the Golden Autumn Time, My Sweet Elaine (1905)
- After they Gather the Hay (1906), lyrics by James J. Walker
- We Have No One to Care for Us Now (1906), lyrics by William Cahill
- It's Always Nice Weather Indoors (1906)
- Red Domino (1906), march and two-step, also published with lyrics by James O’Dea
- Down in the Old Cherry Orchard (1907), lyrics by Alfred Bryan
- When My Girl From Tipp'rary Tips Me (1907), lyrics by William Cahill
- He Lost Her in the Subway (1907), lyrics by Alfred Bryan
- Punch and Judy (1907)
- Down Our Way (1907), lyrics by Janet Allen
- She Was a Grand Old Lady (1907), lyrics by William Cahill
- Take a Trip Down to Luna With Me (1908), lyrics by William Cahill
- When the Parson said the Word that Made Us One (1908), lyrics by William Cahill
- S.R. Henry's Barn Dance (1908)
- When It's Moonlight on the Prairie, Darling Mary, There's a Parson Only Twenty Miles Away (1908), lyrics by Robert F. Roden
- We'll All Go There Together (1908), lyrics by Ralph Bicknell
- Your Picture Says Remember, Tho' Your Letter Says Forget (1908), lyrics by Arthur J. Lamb
- My Way to Heaven is Through Your Love, Sweetheart (1909), lyrics by Arthur J. Lamb
- Under the Maples with Mary-O (1909), lyrics by Edgar Malone
- Father Was a Grand Old Man (1909), lyrics by William Cahill
- My Husband's in the City (1909), lyrics by C.F. Zittel
- Yucatana Man (1910), words by Monroe H. Rosenfeld
- I'm Looking for a Nice Young Fellow Who is Looking for a Nice Young Girl (1910), words by Jeff T. Branen
- Speak One Word (1910), words by Arthur J. Lamb
- I've Got the Time - I've Got the Place, But It's Hard to Find the Girl (1910), lyrics by Ballard MacDonald
- Night Brings the Stars and You (1910), lyrics by Arthur J. Lamb
- O.U. Mike (1910), lyrics by Ballard MacDonalad
- The Wreck of the Good Ship Love (1910), lyrics by Arthur J. Lamb
- Down in Yucatan (1910)
- Oh! Mister Straus! (1910), lyrics by E. Ray Goetz
- T.P.G. Barn Dance (1910)
- When You're in Love with More Than One You're Not in Love at All (1911), lyrics by Alfred Bryan
- I Like the Hat - I Like the Dress, and I Like the Girl That's In It (1911), lyrics by Alfred Bryan
- The Treasures of the World Are Mine (1911), lyrics by Arthur J. Lamb
- When a Fellow Who is Lonesome Meets a Girl Who's Feeling Blue (1911), lyrics by Ballard MacDonald
- That Raggedy Rag (also published as 'That Ragged Rag') (1912), lyrics by Arthur Gillespie James M. Reilly
- Au Revoir, Sweet Marie (1912), lyrics by Ballard MacDonald
- Harvest Days Are Coming, Jennie (1912), lyrics by Arthur J. Lamb
- In A Lonely Cabin, On A Lonely Road, In A Lonely Part of Tennessee (1913), lyrics by George A. Norton
- The Globe Trotters (1913), co-written by E. Platzmann, arr. for orchestra by Carl F. Williams
- Parfum D'Amour (1914)
- By Heck (1914)
- Queen of the South Sea Isles (1915), lyrics by L. Wolfe Gilbert
- Under the Rambling Roses (1916), arr. for band by George F. Briegel
- Love Me Today, Tomorrow We May Part (1917), co-written by D. Onivas and words by Beth Slater Whitson
- Indianola (1917), co-written by D. Onivas
- My Old Man is in the Army Now (1917), lyrics by Roy K. Moulton, co-written by D. Onivas
- Tears of Love (1918), lyrics by Frank H. Warren, dedicated to Norma Talmadge
- The Sister of Rosie O'Grady (1918), words by Frank H. Warren
- Foxy (1918), co-written by D. Onivas
- Kentucky Dream: Waltz (1918), co-written by D. Onivas
- Rambo (1918), co-written by D. Onivas
- The Fighting Navy (1918), lyrics by Charles A. Snyder
- Pahjamah (1919), lyrics by Frank H. Warren, co-written by D. Onivas
- Good Night, Dearie (1919), lyrics by Frank H. Warren, co-written by Domenico Savino
- Himalaya (1919), lyrics by Frank H. Warren, co-written by Domenico Savino
- When Two Hearts Meet (1919), co-written by Domenico Savino
- Now I Know (1919), lyrics by Frank H. Warren, co-written by D. Onivas
- Come and Marry Me (1919), co-written by D. Onivas
- My Desert Fantasy (c.1919), co-written by Domenico Savino
- Moonlight Memories (c.1920), co-written by Domenico Savino
- Little Miss Charity (1920), musical score co-writer with M. Savin
- Cosy Corner (1921), co-written by Domenico Savino
- Dew Drops (1921), co-written by Domenico Savino
- There's Music in the Rustle of a Skirt (1934), words by Janet Allen and J.J. Walker
- Next Door to Heaven (1940)
- Prepare (1940)
- America-prepare (1940), arr. Domenico Savino
- America (1940)
- My Uncle Sam (1940)
- V For Victory (1941)
- Blow Away Your Troubles (1942)
- Bless His Heart (1942)
- Great Emancipation Day (1942)
- Here's a Kiss For Your Lips (1942), retitled, "A Kiss and a Ring"
- Mister Fuehrer (1943)
- There's a Man in the Moon (1944)
- Call of the Whippoorwill (1945), also known as "I Heard A Whipporwill"
- I Lost My Way (c.1945), lyrics by L. Wolfe Gilbert
- Drifting (1947), words by W. Barnes
- When You Lay Your Head on a Cozy Bed (1948)
- Bob O'Donnell (1949)
- Boys' Ranch (1949), dedicated to the Bedford Boys Ranch of Bedford, Texas
- A Prayer in My Heart (1951)
