= Lawrence Welk and His Sparkling Strings =

Studio album by Lawrence Welk and His Sparkling Strings
- Released: 1955
- Genre: Easy listening
- Label: Coral

Lawrence Welk and His Sparkling Strings is an album by Lawrence Welk and His Sparkling Strings. It was released in 1955 on the Coral label (catalog no. CRL-57011). On January 28, 1956, the album reached No. 5 on Billboard magazine's "Popular Albums (Over-All)" chart, trailing only the Oklahoma soundtrack and popular albums by Frank Sinatra (In the Wee Small Hours), Harry Belafonte (Mark Twain and Other Folk Favorites), and Julie London (Julie Is Her Name). Lawrence Welk and His Sparkling Strings remained on that chart for 11 weeks

== Reception ==
Music critic Matt Dennis predicted it would be Welk's best seller, noting that it the tunes were "offered with a steady beat best-suited to the average ballroom dancer," and adding, "The major musical emphasis is on strings but easy listening interludes are presented by Myron Floren on the accordion to make the entire album a fresh addition to any record collection."

Critic Al Rockwell wrote that Welk was seeking to jump into the mood-music genre, but opined that the strings were "far short" of those of groups such as Jackie Gleason and that the arrangements were "conventional at best".

Critic Ed Orloff opined that Welk had come a long way since he led "The Hotsy Totsy Boys" and described the album as "Smooth Stuff."

The album received a rating of three stars in The Encyclopedia of Popular Music.

== Track listing ==
Side 1

1. "Sunrise Serenade" (Frankie Carle, Jack Lawrence)
2. "Twilight Time in Tennessee" (Jay Milton, Ricky Edwards)
3. "Autumn Nocturne" (Josef Myron, Kim Gannon)
4. "Moonlight Cocktail" (Luckey Roberts, Kim Gannon)
5. "Jeannine (I Dream of Lilac Time)" (Nathaniel Shilkret, L. Wolfe Gilbert)
6. "Stars in My Eyes" (Fritz Kreisler, Dorothy Fields)

Side 2

1. "The Waltz You Saved for Me" (Wayne King, Emil Flindt, Gus Kahn)
2. "The Champagne Waltz" (Con Conrad, Ben Oakland, Milton Drake)
3. "When the Organ Played at Twilight" (Jimmy Campbell and Reg Connelly, R. Wallace)
4. "A Blues Serenade" (Mitchell Parish, Frank Signorelli)
5. "Twilight Time" (Buck Ram, Artie Dunn, Monty Nevins, Al Nevins)
6. "Musette" (Richard Barr)
