= Anatole Friedland =

Russian-born American songwriter (1881–1938)

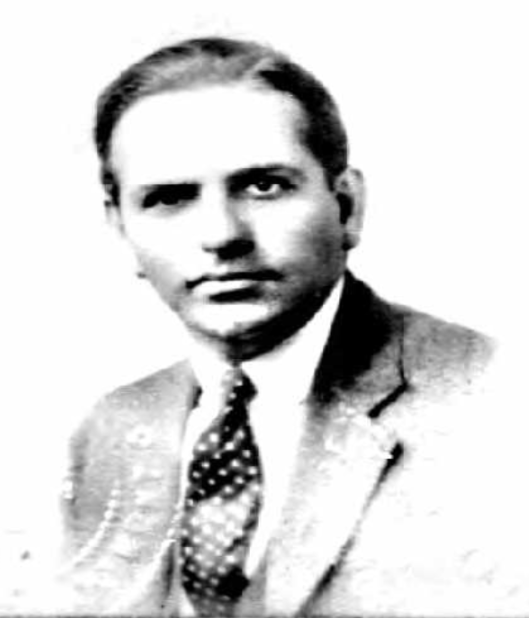
- Friedland in 1922
- Born: March 21, 1881; St. Petersburg, Russia
- Died: July 24, 1938 (aged 50); Atlantic City, New Jersey, U.S.
- Other names: Anatol Friedland, Anato Friedland
- Occupations: Composer, Vaudeville performer, Broadway producer
- Years active: 1911-1936

Anatole Friedland, also spelled as Anatol Friedland and Anato Friedland, (Russian: Анатоль Фридланд; March 21, 1881 – July 24, 1938) was a composer, songwriter, vaudeville performer, and Broadway producer during the 1900s. He is most-known for composing songs with lyricist L. Wolfe Gilbert. Their most popular songs include, "My Sweet Adair" (1915), "Are You From Heaven?" (1917), and "My Own Iona" (1916).

== Personal life ==
Friedland was born on March 21, in St. Petersburg, Russia. Some sources claim his year of birth is 1881, while others list it as 1888. He used March 21, 1884 on his June 21, 1922 passport application.

Friedland's early education came from private schools in St. Petersburg. He then studied music at the Moscow Conservatory before emigrating to the United States sometime after 1900. He attended the Columbia Graduate School of Architecture, Planning and Preservation at Columbia University in New York City, where he studied architecture. While a student at Columbia, Friedland composed music for several varsity shows.

In 1936, Friedland had one of his legs amputated. Shortly after that, he retired and resided at The Ritz-Carlton Hotel in Atlantic City, New Jersey. Friedland died on July 24, 1938. His daughter, Gloria Greer, was eight years old at the time of his death. She would go on to become a reporter, editor, and talk show hostess. He was Jewish.

His widow was Rosalind "Rollie" Friedland, (nee Schiff) later known as Rollie Landers. She founded Sand-to-Sea magazine.

== Career ==
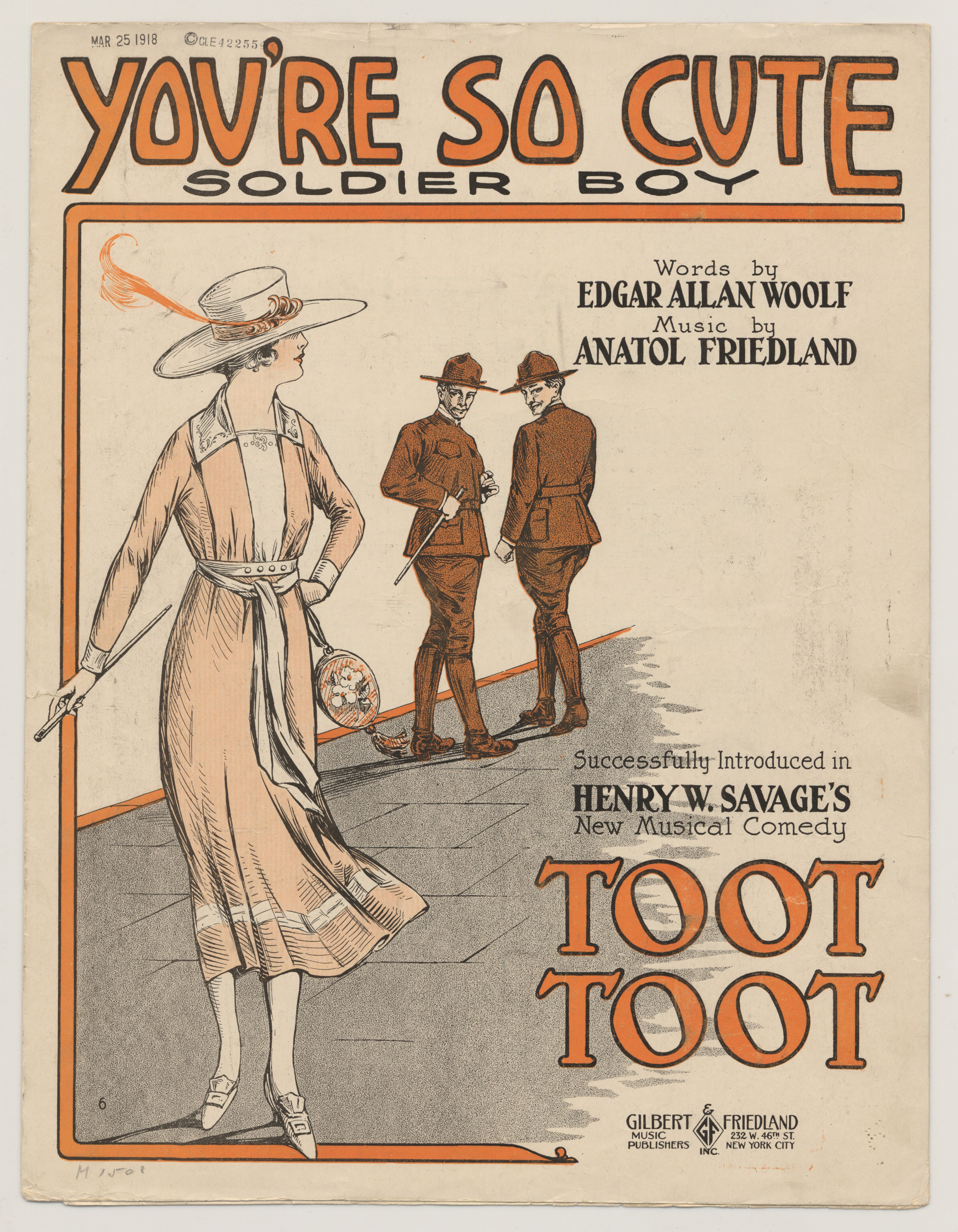
You're So Cute, Soldier Boy cover; Music by Friedland

After graduating, Friedland worked as an architect by day and composed music at night. As an architect, he earned $16 per week. He soon drifted more towards vaudevilles.

In 1911, Friedland and lyricist Malvin Franklin wrote the score for the Broadway musical, The Wife Hunters. The musical starred Emma Carus and Lew Fields. Due to its success, Friedland was hired by the Shubert family to compose music for their Winter Garden productions, including The Passing Show. In 1912, he wrote the music for the Shubert hit, Broadway to Paris, which featured Gertrude Hoffmann, Louise Dresser, and Irène Bordoni. He also collaborated with Lee Shubert on musicals.

His song, "My Little Persian Rose," released in 1912, put him on the market.

Friedland met L. Wolfe Gilbert, a fellow Russian, in 1913. The two would go on to write many successful songs together, including a handful of World War I songs. Sometimes they would perform the songs on stage together. Other times Friedland would perform the songs alone, playing the piano and singing. They set up miniature revues which featured their songs. In the early 1930s, Friedland produced "tabloid" versions of Broadway musicals. These toured motion picture houses that showed one film feature and one live vaudeville. At the beginning of their careers, Barbara Stanwyck and Mae Clarke appeared in these vaudevilles. Friedland and Gilbert's first song issued by their own publishing firm was, Are You From Heaven?. The Gilbert & Friedland Publishing Company operated for a few successful years. Its business would decline after a five-and-ten-cent store ordered five million copies of one song (Afghanistan), but reversed the deal after the song failed to catch on.

In November 1919, Friedland returned to the publishing staff of Stern & Company, and was considered "one of the foremost writers of that organization."

Besides Gilbert, Friedland also collaborated with Harold R. Atteridge, and Edgar Allan Woolf. He also gave Phil Regan his start as a singer.

For most of his career, he worked as a vaudeville performer and was a headliner in musical productions. For two decades, Friedland appeared in or produced "lavish revues." One of these revues titled, Musicland (1919), starred Friedland and "a bevy of beautiful girls." At the time it was considered the most costly production in theatrical history, and included bizarre costumes, scenic effects, and thoughtful lyrics. These elaborate productions earned him the nickname, the "Ziegfeld of Vaudeville." Friedland headlined on the B. F. Keith Circuit in Anatol's Affairs of 1924.

During prohibition, Friedland opened and operated a speakeasy known as Club Anatole. Friedland performed many of his songs at this club, which was located on West 44th Street, between Sixth and Seventh Avenues in New York. Stanwyck, Clarke, and Dorothy Sheppard were hired to perform at the club. Friedland became protective of the three women and gave them advice on how to navigate Broadway and Tin Pan Alley.

In 1923, Friedland joined the American Society of Composers, Authors and Publishers.

== Selected works ==
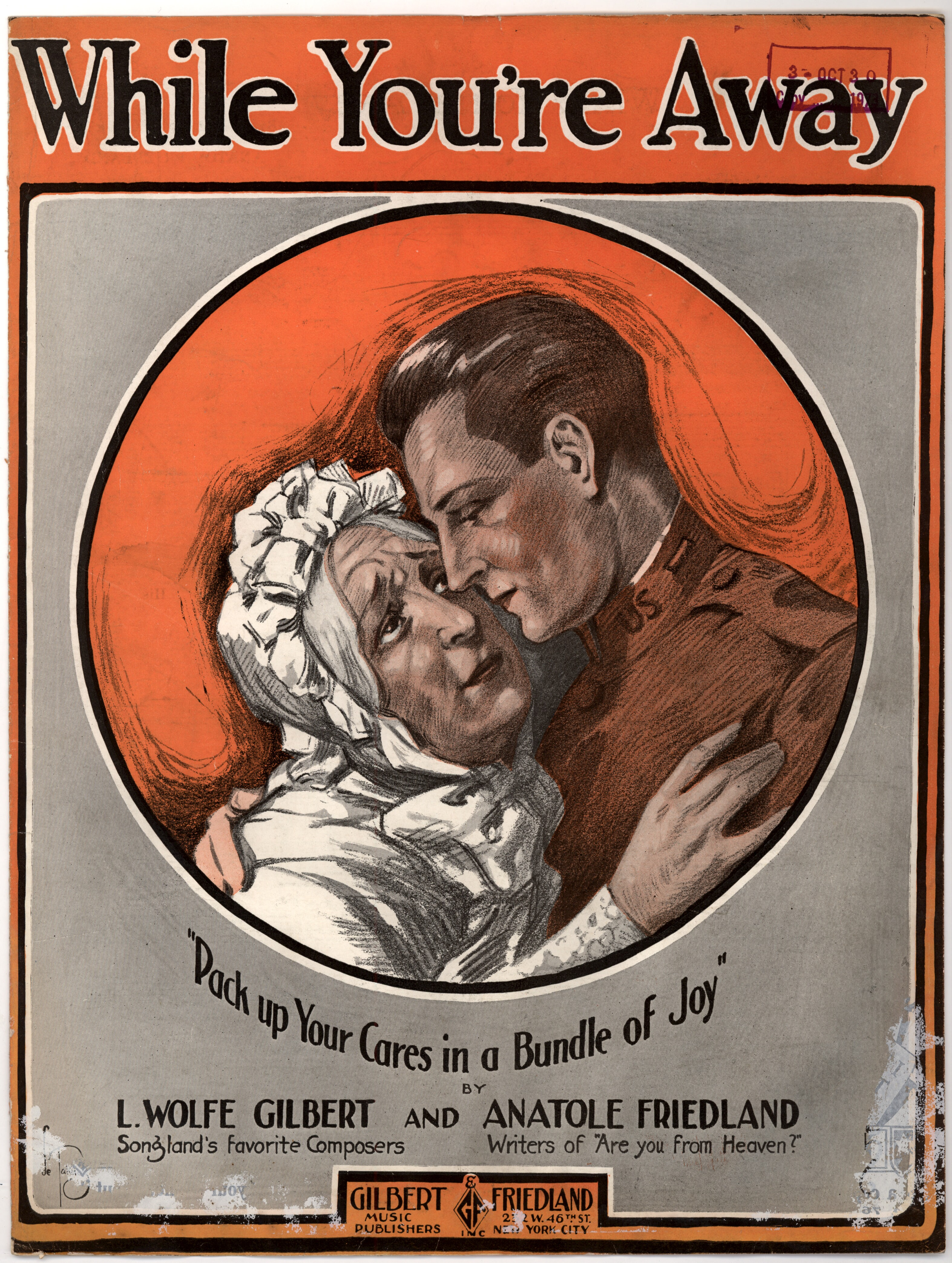
While You're away Cover; Gilbert & Friedland WWI song

Lyrics by L. Wolfe Gilbert

- While You're Away (Pack Up Your Cares in a Bundle of Joy). (1918). Gilbert Friedland Music Publishers. OCLC 8342758
- While You're Away. (1918). Gilbert Friedland Music Publishers. OCLC 861077451
- Singapore. (1918). Gilbert & Friedland, Inc. OCLC 42917058
- (After the Battle is Over) Then You Can Come Back to Me. (1918). Gilbert & Friedland, Inc. OCLC 902638331
- Are You From Heaven?. (1917). Gilbert & Friedland. OCLC 9657464
- Camouflage. (1917). with E.E. Watson. J.W. Stern & Co.. OCLC 80540979
- Lily of the Valley, A "Nut" Song. (1917). J.W. Stern. OCLC 20119545
- Set Aside Your Tears (Till the Boys Come Marching Home). with Malvin Franklin. (1917). Joseph W. Stern & Co. OCLC 17799622
- Shades in the Night. (1916). J.W. Stern. OCLC 20120678
- My Own Iona. with Henry Burr, Manuel Romain, and Carey Morgan. (1916). Rex. OCLC 62472671
- My Sweet Adair. with Domenico Savino. (1915). Joseph W. Stern. OCLC 30124157

Lyrics by Edgar Allan Woolf

- You're So Cute, Soldier Boy. (1918). Gilbert & Friedland. OCLC 81692532
