= Abel Baer =

American songwriter (1893–1976)

- Abel Baer (seated) in 1966
- Born: Abel Baer; March 16, 1893; Baltimore, Maryland, United States
- Died: October 5, 1976 (aged 83)
- Occupation(s): Songwriter, Broadway composer
- Years active: c 1945-?

Abel Baer (March 16, 1893 – October 5, 1976) was an American songwriter, associated with Tin Pan Alley.

== Biography ==
Born in Baltimore, Maryland, Baer graduated from the College of Physicians and Surgeons, specialising in dentistry. Baer left medicine after serving in World War I and began work as a songwriter for a music publisher.

Among Baer's collaborators were L. Wolfe Gilbert, Stanley Adams, Cliff Friend, Sam M. Lewis and Mabel Wayne.

Baer moved to Hollywood in 1929, contributing songs to Paramount on Parade, True to the Navy and Frozen Justice. On Broadway, Baer worked on the scores for the musicals Lady Do and Old Bill M.P.

== Songs written by Baer ==
- "Am I to Blame?"
- "Blue Hoosier Blues" OCLC 221287851
- "Chapel of the Roses"
- "Don't Wait 'Til the Night Before Christmas"
- "Don't Wake Me Up, Let Me Dream" OCLC 10420106
- "Garden in Granada" OCLC 48247028
- "Gee But You're Swell" OCLC 10424942
- "Harriet" OCLC 34725752
- "I Miss My Swiss" OCLC 20597928
- "I'm Sitting Pretty in a Pretty Little City" OCLC 48435885
- "It’s the Girl" OCLC 25128378
- "June Night” OCLC 26011525
- "Lucky Lindy!" OCLC 13179318
- "Mama Loves Papa: Papa Loves Mama" OCLC 367981173
- "My Mother's Eyes" OCLC 20813436
- "The Night When Love Was Born" OCLC 18888842
- "There Are Such Things" OCLC 222128061
- "When the One You Love, Loves You"
