= Then You Can Come Back to Me =

"Then You Can Come Back To Me"

Song
- Language: English
- Published: 1918
- Songwriter(s): Wolfe Gilbert & Anatol Friedland

Then You Can Come Back To Me is a World War I song written and composed by Wolfe Gilbert & Anatol Friedland. The song was first published in 1918 by Gilbert & Friedland, Inc., in New York, NY. The sheet music cover depicts silhouetted soldiers marching with pennants labeled Peace, Victory, and Democracy.

The sheet music can be found at the Pritzker Military Museum & Library.
