= Set Aside Your Tears (Till the Boys Come Marching Home) =

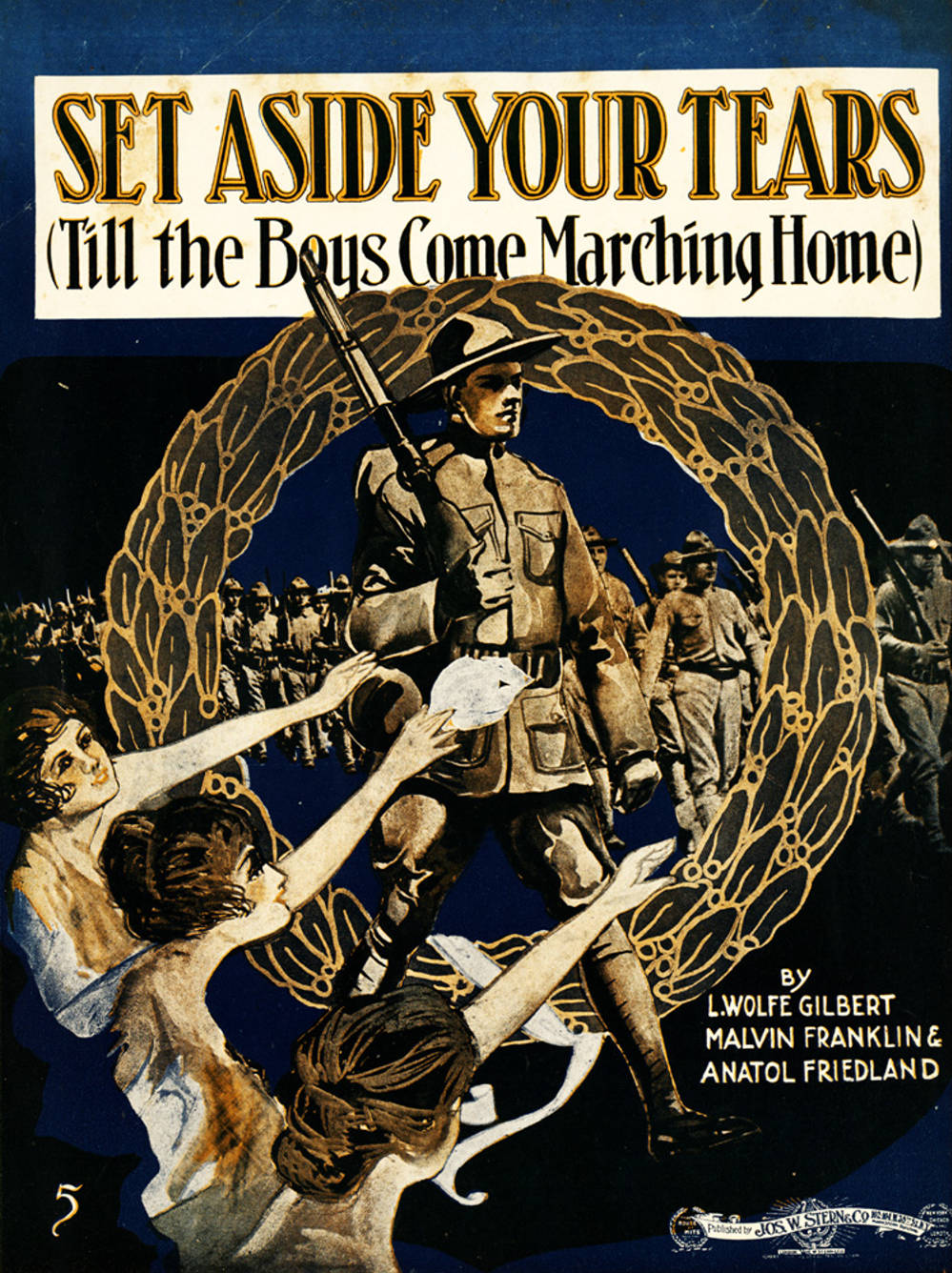
- Sheet Music cover

Song
- Language: English
- Published: 1917
- Songwriter(s): Wolfe Gilbert, Malvin Franklin, and Anatole Friedland

Set Aside Your Tears (Till the Boys Come Marching Home) is a World War I song written and composed by Wolfe Gilbert, Malvin Franklin, and Anatole Friedland. The song was first published in 1917 by Jos. W. Stern & Co. in New York, NY. The sheet music cover depicts a woman waving to marching troops.

The sheet music can be found at the Pritzker Military Museum & Library.
