= While You're Away =

"While You're Away (Pack Up Your Cares in a Bundle of Joy)"
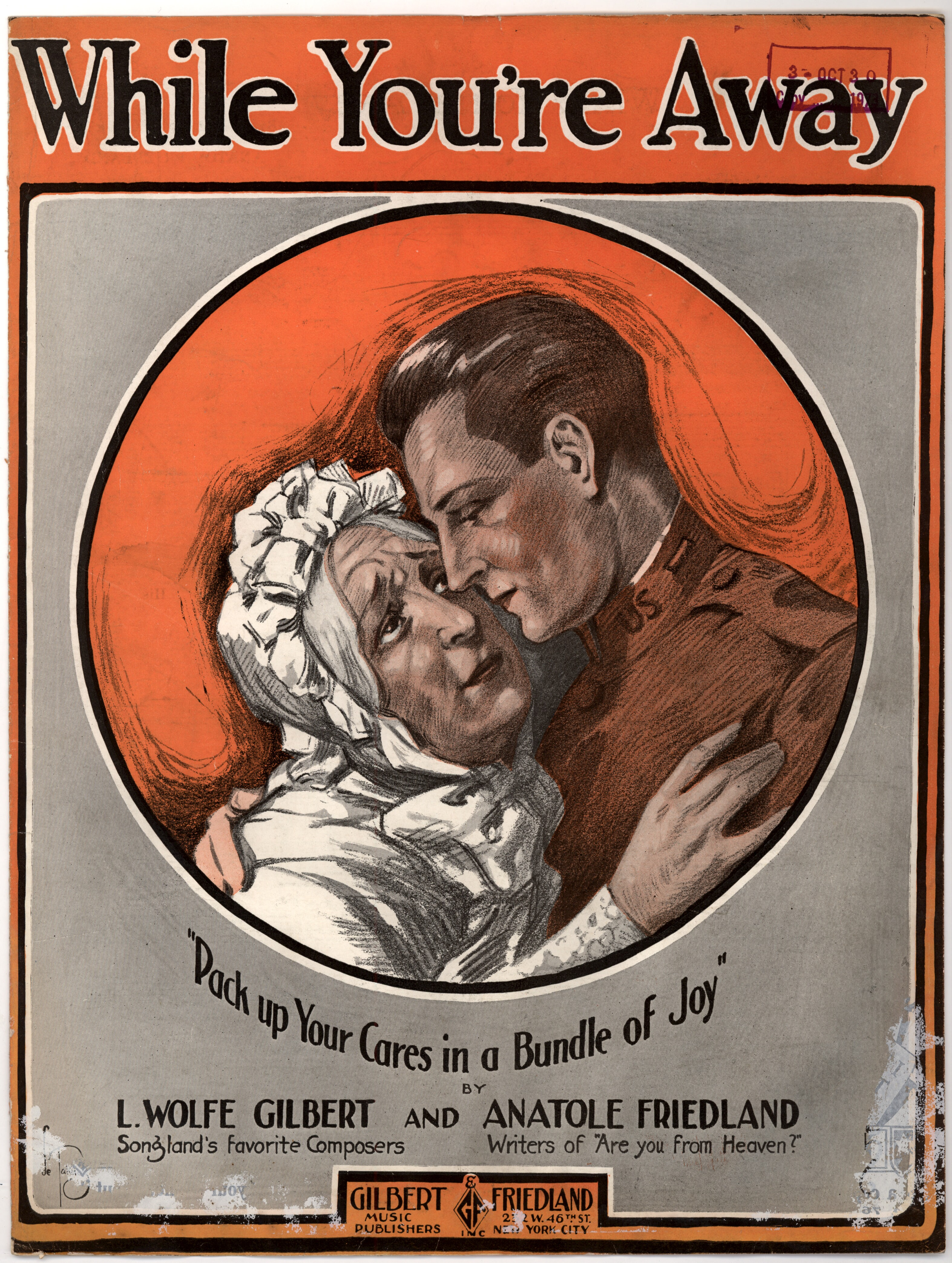
- Sheet music cover

Song
- Published: 1918
- Composer(s): L. Wolfe Gilbert
- Lyricist(s): Anatole Friedland

While You're Away (Pack Up Your Cares in a Bundle of Joy) is a World War I song released in 1918. L. Wolfe Gilbert and Anatole Friedland composed the music and lyrics. It was published by Gilbert & Friedland Inc. The song was performed by Harry Ellis; and also by The Peerless Quartet. In October 1918, it reached the number five spot on the US song charts. In December 1918, the song reached a peak position of number two on Top 100 US Songs of that year.

The sheet music cover features an illustration by Andre De Takacs. The cover art for the song features an older woman and a soldier embracing.
