= Lucky Lindy! =

"Lucky Lindy"
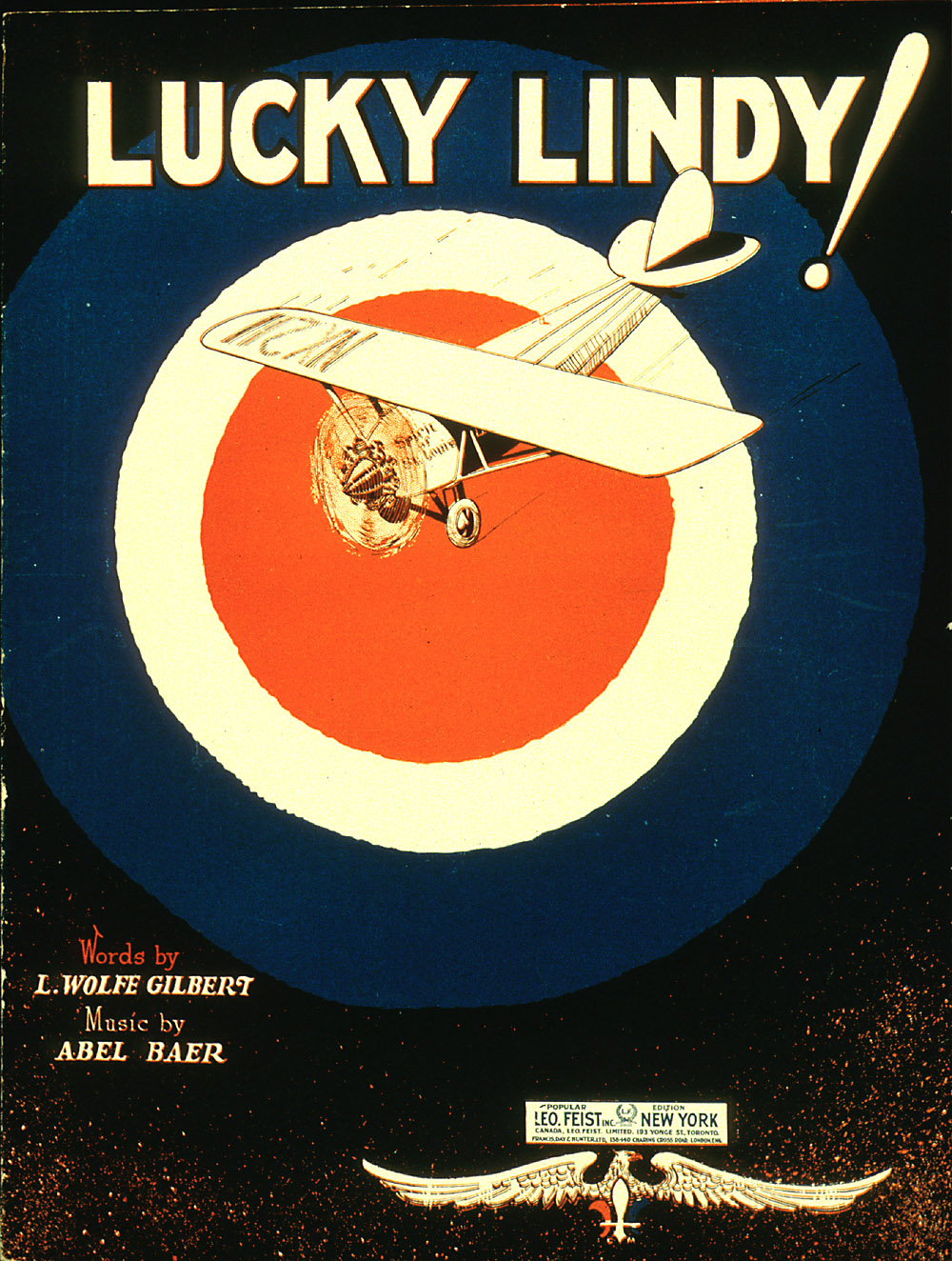
- "Lucky Lindy!" sheet music cover

Song
- Published: 1927
- Songwriter(s): Composer: Abel Baer; Lyricist: L. Wolfe Gilbert

"Lucky Lindy!" is a fox-trot song composed by Abel Baer, with lyrics by L. Wolfe Gilbert. It was published by Harmony in 1927. The song was the first to celebrate Charles Lindbergh's transatlantic flight in the Spirit of St. Louis and his landing in Paris. Hundreds more followed.

The sheet music can be found at the Pritzker Military Museum & Library.

== Lyrics ==
The piece is "Dedicated to the mother of 'Lucky Lindy'" and the sheet music describes it as a "Fox-Trot Song." Gilbert's lyrics, as printed in the sheet music, are as follows:

From coast to coast we all can boast
And sing a toast to one
Who's made a name, for being game.
He was born with wings as great
As any bird that flies,
A lucky star guides him afar.

CHORUS:
"Lucky Lindy," up in the sky
Fair or windy,
He's flying high
Peerless, fearless, knows ev'ry cloud,
The kind of a son makes a mother feel proud
"Plucky Lindy" rides all alone
In a little plane all his own;
"Lucky Lindy" showed them the way
And he's the hero of the day!

Just like a child he simply smiled
While we were wild with fear,
This Yankee lad, the world went mad.
Ev'rywhere they prayed for him
To safely cross the sea,
And he arrived in Gay Paree!

CHORUS (repeated):
"Lucky Lindy," up in the sky
Fair or windy,
He's flying high
Peerless, fearless, knows ev'ry cloud,
The kind of a son makes a mother feel proud
"Plucky Lindy" rides all alone
In a little plane all his own;
"Lucky Lindy" showed them the way
And he's the hero of the day!
