= Ramona (1928 song) =

1928 song by Gene Austin

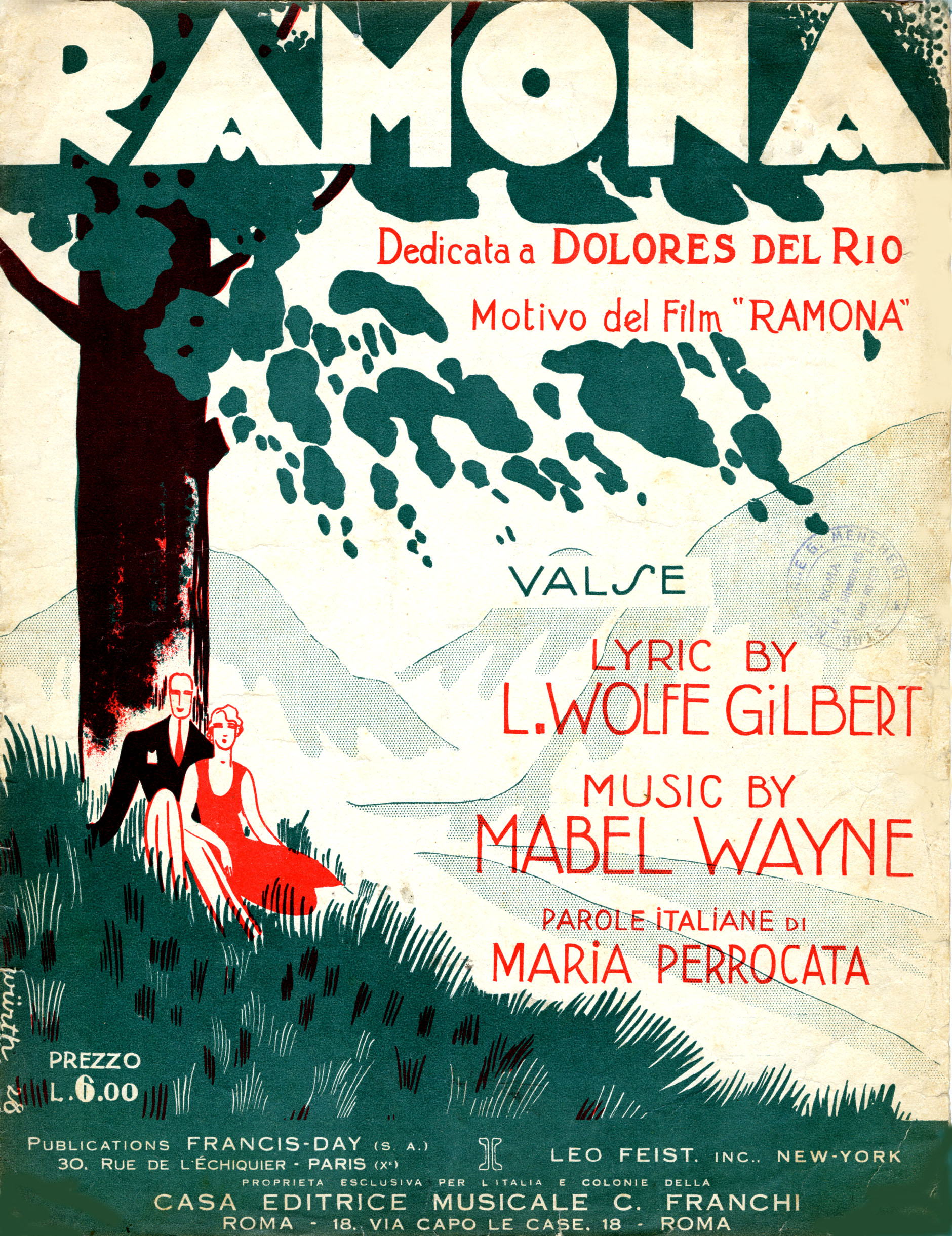

Song by Gene Austin
- B-side: "Girl Of My Dreams"
- Published: 1928 by Leo Feist, Inc., EMI Feist Catalog Inc.
- Released: May 11, 1928
- Recorded: April 2, 1928
- Studio: Victor Studios, Camden, New Jersey
- Genre: Jazz, Pop Vocal
- Label: Victor 21334
- Composer(s): Mabel Wayne
- Lyricist(s): L. Wolfe Gilbert

Gene Austin singles chronology
"My Melancholy Baby" (1928)	"Ramona" (1928)	"Jeannine, I Dream of Lilac Time" (1928)

"Ramona" is a 1928 song with lyrics by L. Wolfe Gilbert and music by Mabel Wayne. Composed for the 1928 feature film Ramona, it was the first theme song written for the movies.

The original lyrics and music of the song entered the public domain in the United States in 2024.

== History ==
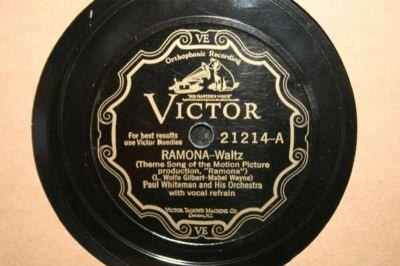
1928 Victor 78, 21214-A, by Paul Whiteman featuring Bix Beiderbecke.

It was created as the title song for publicity to the 1928 silent adventure film-romance Ramona (based on the 1884 novel Ramona by Helen Hunt Jackson). The song was used again in the 1936 remake of the movie. Ramona was recorded in 1928 by Dolores del Río for the film. Gene Austin's 1928 version charted for 17 weeks, with eight weeks at No. 1, and easily topped a million in sales.

== Recordings ==
- On record it was a popular hit, usually performed as a romantic ballad, sometimes with a Latin inflection by "Whispering" Jack Smith and, in an idiosyncratic arrangement recorded on 4 January 1928, the Paul Whiteman Orchestra. The Paul Whiteman version, Victor 21214-A, featuring Bix Beiderbecke on cornet, was No. 1 for 3 weeks on the Billboard charts in 1928. Gene Austin's recording was No. 1 for 8 weeks the same year. Ruth Etting also recorded a version, which reached No. 10.
- Les Brown and His Band of Renown recorded "Ramona" in 1953.
- In 1958, Jim Reeves recorded "Ramona" for his album Girls I Have Known.
- It was a German, and Dutch number one hit in 1960 for the Blue Diamonds, arranged in an upbeat style similar to The Everly Brothers recordings of that period.
- In 1964 it was a UK hit for The Bachelors who reached the No. 4 spot in the charts during a 13-week stay.
- Singer Billy Walker revived the song for the country market in 1968, reaching the top 10 of the US country charts, peaking at No. 8.
- Grady Martin released an instrumental version in 1965 on his Instrumentally Yours album.
- This song was covered by the late Singaporean singer/songwriter/lyricist Su Yin (舒雲) in Mandarin Chinese language with Chinese lyrics written by Li Tian (黎天) and given the title name of蕾夢娜, appearing on his LP album 黃昏放牛＊一片青青的草地, and released by EMI Columbia Records in 1967.

== Popular culture ==
- It has been used on the soundtracks of several other films, most recently by Ken Loach in Land and Freedom (1995) and in the BAFTA-nominated Harry un ami qui vous veut du bien (2000).
