= When It's Moonlight on the Prairie =

"When It's Moonlight On The Prairie"
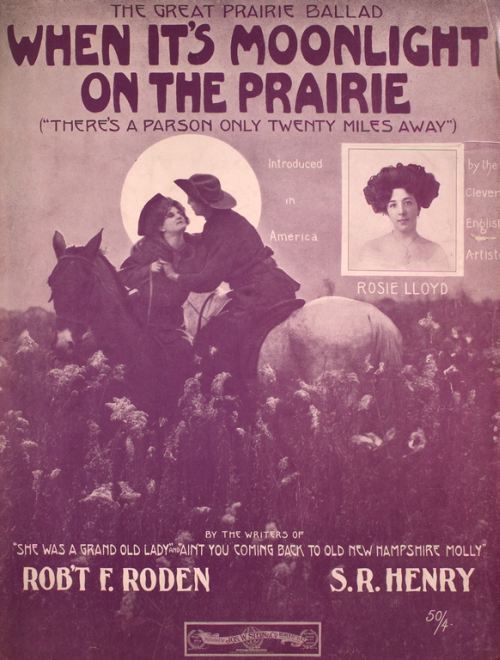
- Cover, sheet music, 1908

Song
- Published: 1908
- Genre: Popular music
- Composer(s): Robert F. Roden
- Lyricist(s): S.R. Henry

"When It's Moonlight On The Prairie" is a popular song published in 1908 with lyrics by Robert F. Roden and music by S.R. Henry. The lyrics tell of a cowboy eloping with his Mary. The chorus is:

When it's moonlight on the prairie, darling Mary,
I'll be waiting with the ponies, love for you;
There's a parson only twenty miles away, twenty miles away, twenty miles away;
When the knot is tied, then side by side we'll ride, dear,
To a pretty little home I've built for you;
I'll be waiting, waiting, waiting for you, Mary,
When it's moonlight on the prairie, Mary dear!

"When It's Moonlight on the Prairie" has been recorded many times.

== Bibliography ==
- Roden, Robert F. (w.); Henry, S.R. (m.). "When It's Moonlight On The Prairie" (Sheet music). New York: Jos. W. Stern & Co. (1908).
