= You're So Cute, Soldier Boy =

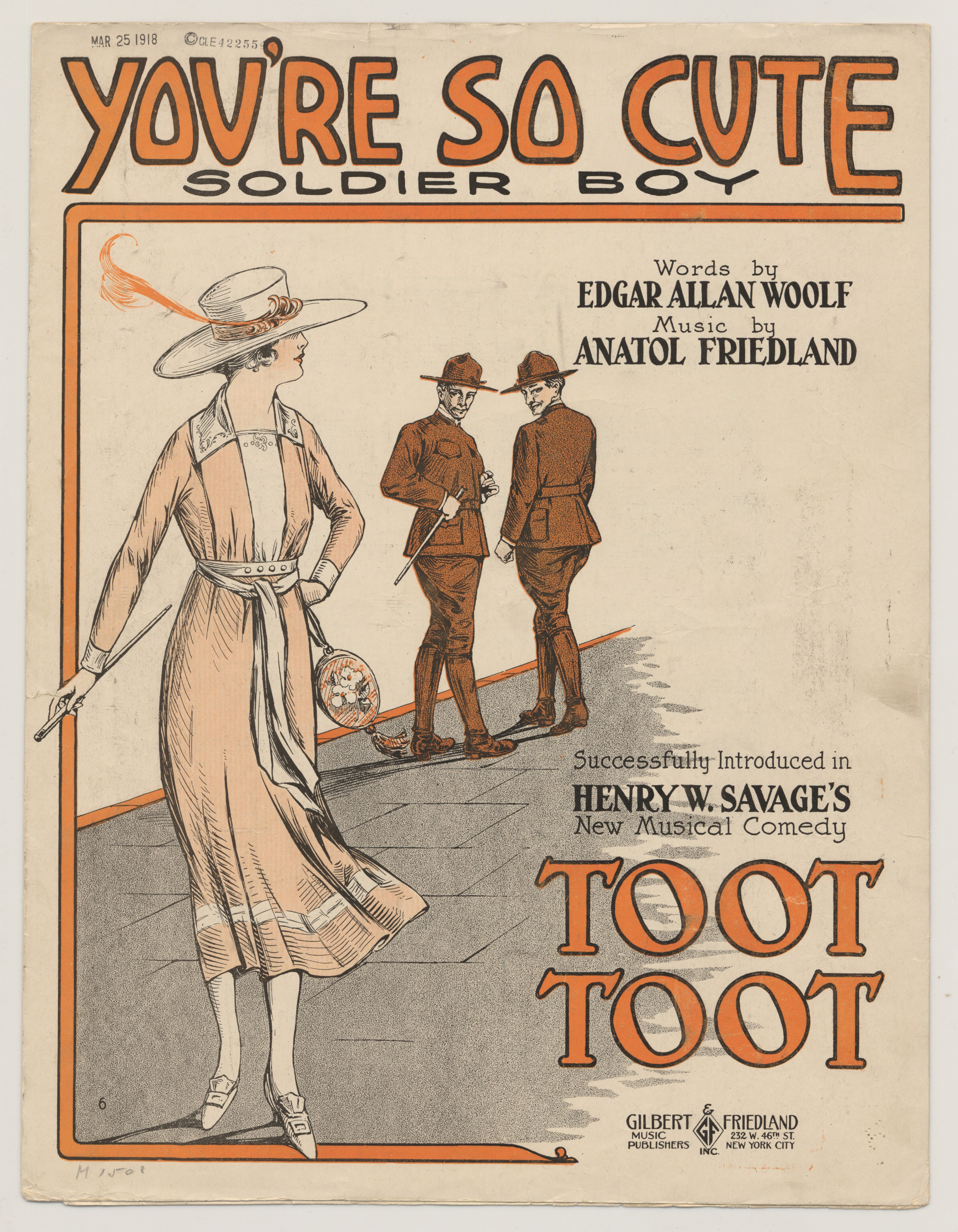
- Sheet music cover of "You're so cute, soldier boy"

Song
- Released: 1918
- Label: T.B. Harms Co.
- Composer(s): Anatole Friedland
- Lyricist(s): Edgar Allan Woolf

You're So Cute, Soldier Boy is a World War I era song released in 1918. Edgar Allan Woolf wrote the lyrics. Anatole Friedland composed the music. The song was written for Henry W. Savage's musical Toot Toot. It was published by Tin Pan Alley music publisher T.B. Harms Co. of New York, New York. On the cover is a woman in the foreground, looking back at two soldiers dressed in uniform.

In the song, the narrator explains how a soldier's uniform transforms her view of men she previously had no interest in. Her attraction is heightened, no matter if the men are short or tall, because of the "magic" of a khaki uniform. The chorus is as follows:

You're so cute, oh so cute
In your new khaki suit
When you're marching down the line
Then I give this counter sign
"It's a Soldier's Boy for mine"
As I nod coyly, nod
To the boys of the squad
How my heart is thrilled with joy
Oh I'd love to play hookey
With each good looking rookie
You're so cute,
Oh so cute, soldier boy

The sheet music can be found at Pritzker Military Museum & Library.
