= Jeannine, I Dream of Lilac Time =

1928 song by Gene Austin

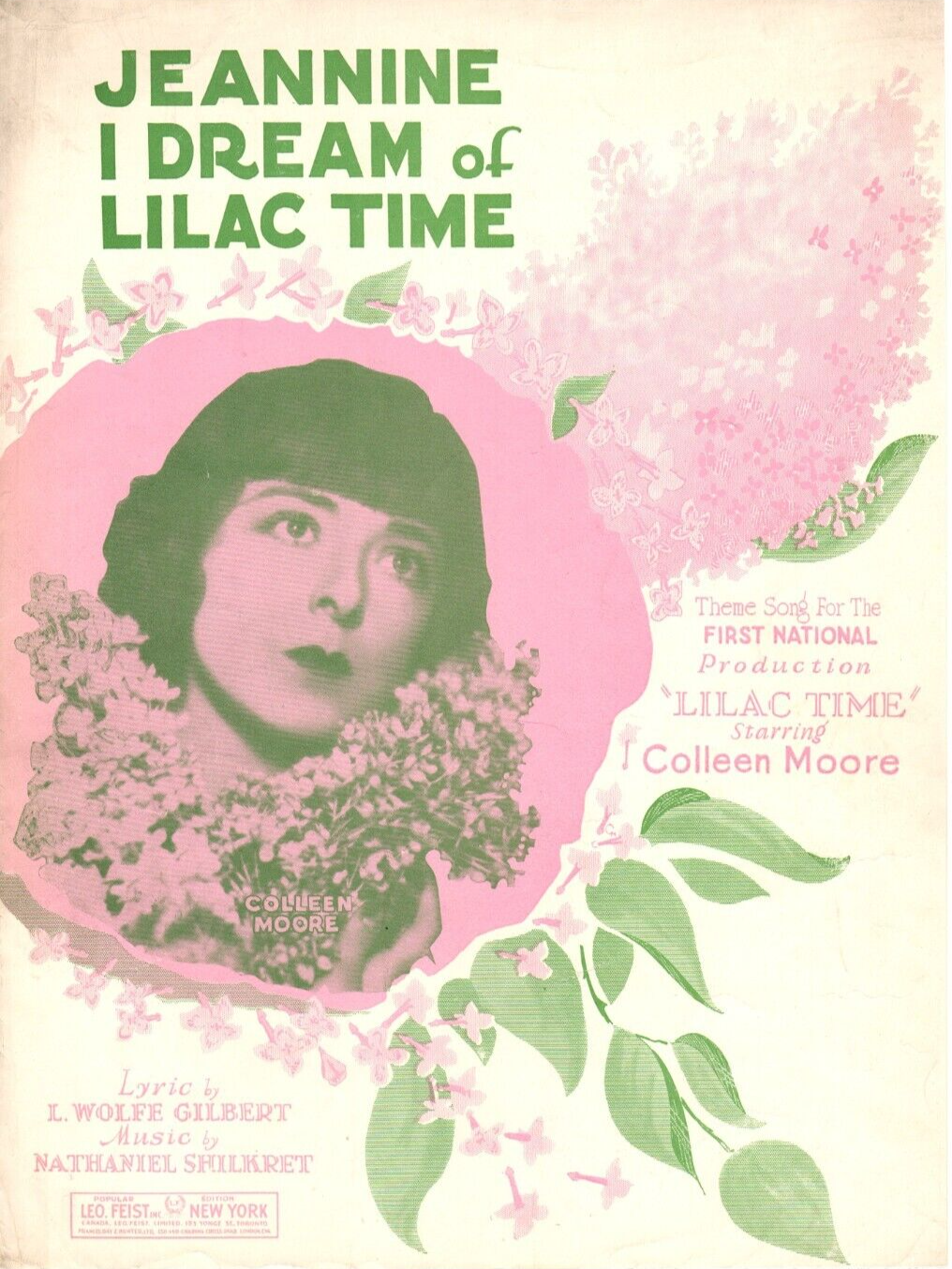
- Sheet music cover featuring Colleen Moore, 1928

Song by Gene Austin
- B-side: "Then Came The Dawn"
- Published: 1928 by Leo Feist, Inc., Rose Gilbert Music Company
- Released: September 7, 1928
- Recorded: June 26, 1928
- Studio: Victor Studios, Camden, New Jersey
- Genre: Jazz, Pop Vocal
- Label: Victor 21564
- Composer(s): Nathaniel Shilkret
- Lyricist(s): L. Wolfe Gilbert

Gene Austin singles chronology
"Ramona" (1928)	"Jeannine, I Dream of Lilac Time" (1928)	"Carolina Moon" (1929)

"Jeannine, I Dream of Lilac Time" is a 1928 song composed by Nathaniel Shilkret with lyrics by L. Wolfe Gilbert. It is the theme song of the silent film Lilac Time, starring Gary Cooper and Colleen Moore. The song sold almost two million copies of sheet music and was recorded by over a hundred top artists, including Louis Armstrong, Erroll Garner, Skitch Henderson, Guy Lombardo, The London Philharmonic Orchestra, John McCormack, Mitch Miller, Hugo Montenegro, The Platters, and Lawrence Welk.

The version by Gene Austin was released on September 7, 1928, and rose to number 1 for five weeks.

It is part of the soundtrack of the 1962 motion picture Tender Is the Night and was used in an episode of the television series Miss Marple.
