= Edgar Allan Woolf =

American dramatist

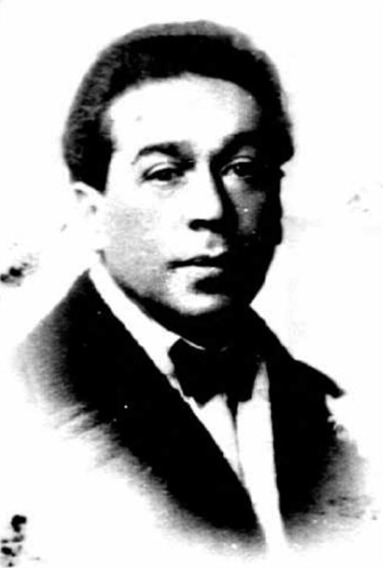
- Woolf in 1922
- Born: April 25, 1881; New York City, U.S.
- Died: December 9, 1943 (aged 62); Santa Monica, California, U.S.
- Occupations: Lyricist; screenwriter; playwright

Edgar Allan Woolf (April 25, 1881 – December 9, 1943) was an American lyricist, playwright, and screenwriter. He is best known as the co-author of the script for the 1939 film The Wizard of Oz.

== Early years and education ==
Woolf was the son of Albert E. Woolf, a feather works employee, a manufacturer of disinfectant and an inventor of electrical devices, and Rosamond Wimpfheimer Woolf. Woolf attended City College of New York and Columbia University, graduating from the latter with an A.B. in 1901. He wrote the annual Varsity Show, The Mischief Maker, in his senior year.

== Actor and playwright ==
Woolf and Florence Ryerson ca 1940

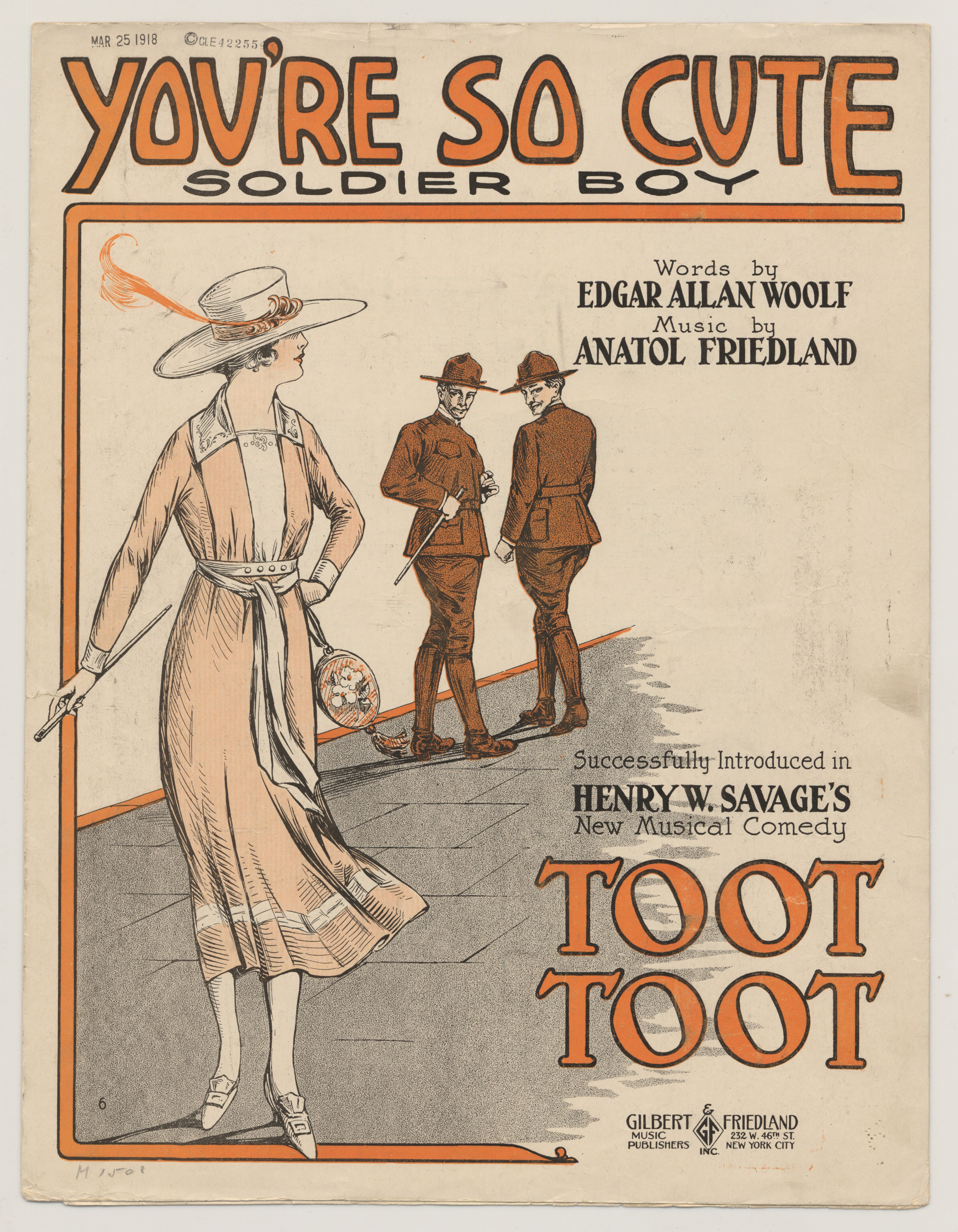
Sheet music of "You're So Cute, Soldier Boy" (1917)

Woolf joined the Murray Hill Stock Company as an actor, and played in New York City with it for several years, but soon was writing sketches and plays for vaudeville star Pat Rooney (1880–1962) and Mrs. Patrick Campbell. One of the better-known plays Woolf wrote for Pat Rooney was "Wings of Smoke." He also wrote, in collaboration with Jerome Kern, the comic opera, "Head over Heels," in which Mitzi Hajos starred. Woolf was a prolific writer and produced many sketches for vaudeville.

Woolf wrote the book for Mam'zelle Champagne, a musical revue, that opened on June 25, 1906. On opening night at the outdoor Madison Square Garden Roof Theatre, millionaire playboy Harry K. Thaw shot and killed architect Stanford White. The otherwise undistinguished musical's run continued for some 60 performances largely due to the publicity from this incident.

Woolf wrote the book for Toot-Toot, Henry W. Savage's 1918 Broadway musical based on Rupert Hughes' play Excuse Me. Woolf also wrote the lyrics for a song introduced in the show, "You're So Cute, Soldier Boy". He wrote the book to Sigmund Romberg's 1921 musical Love Birds.

== Screenwriter ==
Woolf moved to Los Angeles in the early 1930s to write screenplays for Metro-Goldwyn-Mayer. He and frequent collaborator Florence Ryerson revised Noel Langley's screenplay for The Wizard of Oz (1939), which in turn was based on L. Frank Baum's children's novel The Wonderful Wizard of Oz. Together they created the Wizard's counterpart, Professor Marvel.

== Personal life ==
Woolf was described by Samuel Marx, MGM's story editor during the 1930s, as a "wild, red-haired homosexual." He loved to cook and would spend hours cooking for his Saturday night dinner parties, where he entertained directors and writers.

== Death ==
At his Beverly Hills home, 911 North Beverly Drive, on December 9, 1943, Woolf's three servants found him lying at the bottom of a flight of steps that led to the kitchen. Woolf had a blind dog that he took for a daily walk, and the police believed he had tripped over the dog's leash, fracturing his skull. Woolf was taken to St. John's Santa Monica Hospital at 2 pm and died two hours later. The coroner's autopsy revealed the cause of death to be a basal skull fracture.
