= Mabel Wayne =

American musician, composer and screenwriter (1890–1978)

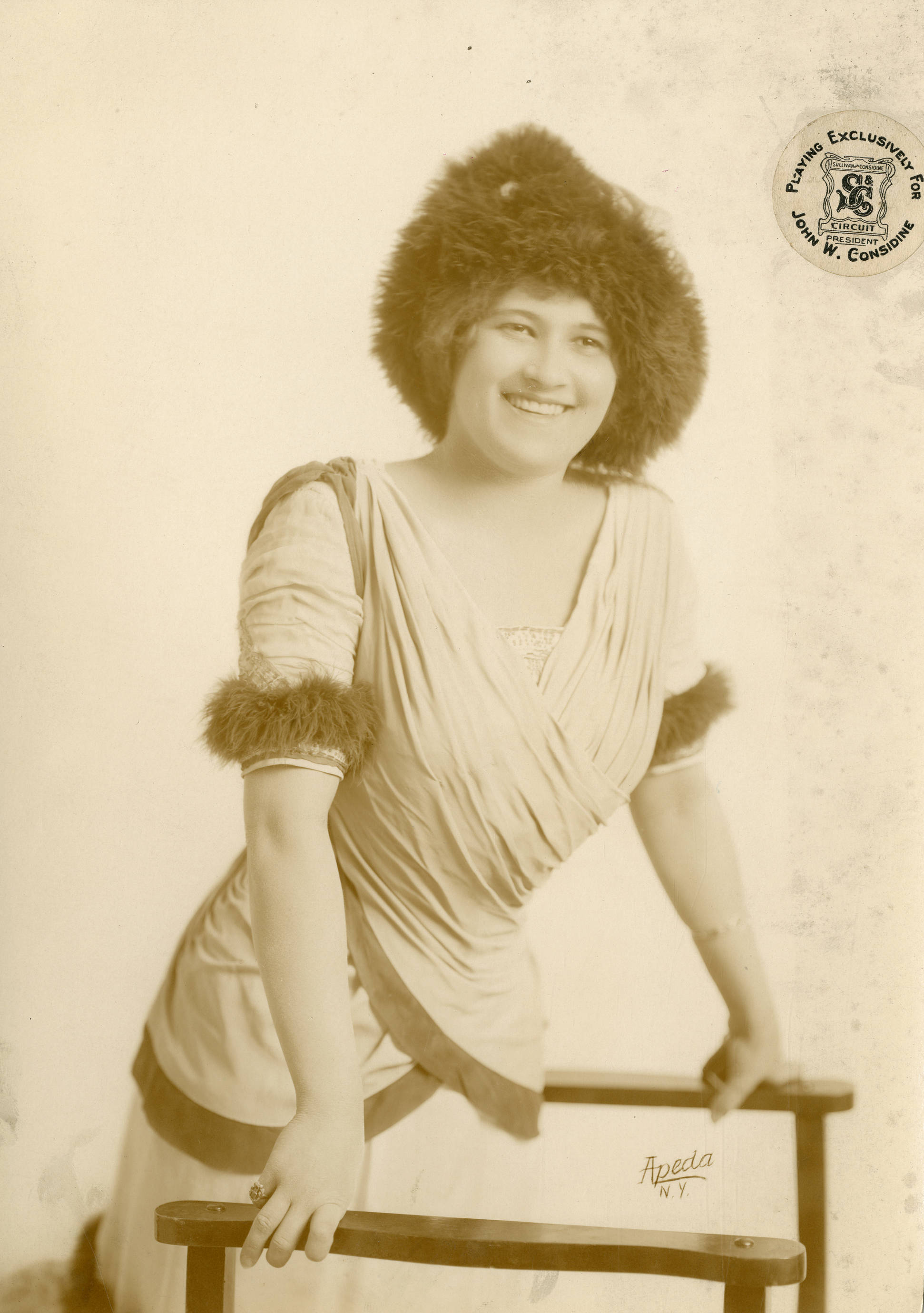
- Wayne, c. 1920s

Background information
- Born: July 16, 1890; Brooklyn, New York, U.S
- Died: June 19, 1978 (aged 87) Glen Cove, New York, U.S
- Genres: Jazz; popular music
- Occupations: Musician; composer; screenwriter
- Instruments: Vocals; piano
- Years active: 1920s–1978

Mabel Wayne (born Mabel Wimpfheimer, July 16, 1890 – June 19, 1978) was an American musician, composer, and screenwriter. She is noted for being one of the first female composers to write successful hit songs. Her music career spanned from the 1920s until her death in 1978. Her songs included "In a Little Spanish Town" (1926), "Ramona" (1928), and "It Happened in Monterey" (1930).

Many of her songs were widely covered by various musicians.

== Biography ==
She was born in Brooklyn, New York as Mabel Wimpfheimer in 1890 (although she later preferred to use the dates 1899 and 1904), and studied piano in Switzerland and then at the New York School of Music.

Wayne performed as a concert pianist and singer, and as a dancer in vaudeville. In the 1920s and 1930s she collaborated with several lyricists including L. Wolfe Gilbert, Sam M. Lewis and Joe Young. Wayne was particularly noted for her Spanish-American themed songs. She wrote for movies including King of Jazz, and later for British films, including Dance Band (1935). During the 1930s, she made various recordings singing and playing piano.

After a short-lived marriage in the 1910s, Mabel Wayne married Nick Campbell, a music publisher based in New York, on March 15, 1948 in the Little Church of the West, located in Reno, Nevada. Lanny Ross and his wife served as the best man and matron of honor.

== Legacy ==
Mabel Wayne was inducted to the Songwriters Hall of Fame in 1972.

== Death ==
Mabel Wayne died at Glen Cove, Long Island, in 1978 at the age of 87.

== Selected works ==
- 1925 – "Don't Wake Me Up, Let Me Dream", lyrics by L. Wolfe Gilbert
- 1926 – "In a Little Spanish Town", lyrics by Sam M. Lewis & Joe Young
- 1928 – "Ramona", lyrics by L. Wolfe Gilbert.
- 1930 – "It Happened in Monterey", lyrics by Billy Rose for the film King of Jazz later recorded and popularized by Frank Sinatra in 1956.
- 1934 – "Little Man You've Had a Busy Day", lyrics by Maurice Sigler and Al Hoffman.
- 1937 – "Why Don’t You Fall In Love With Me?", lyrics by Al Lewis
- 1941 – "I Understand", lyrics by Kim Gannon.
