= L. Wolfe Gilbert =

American songwriter (1886–1970)

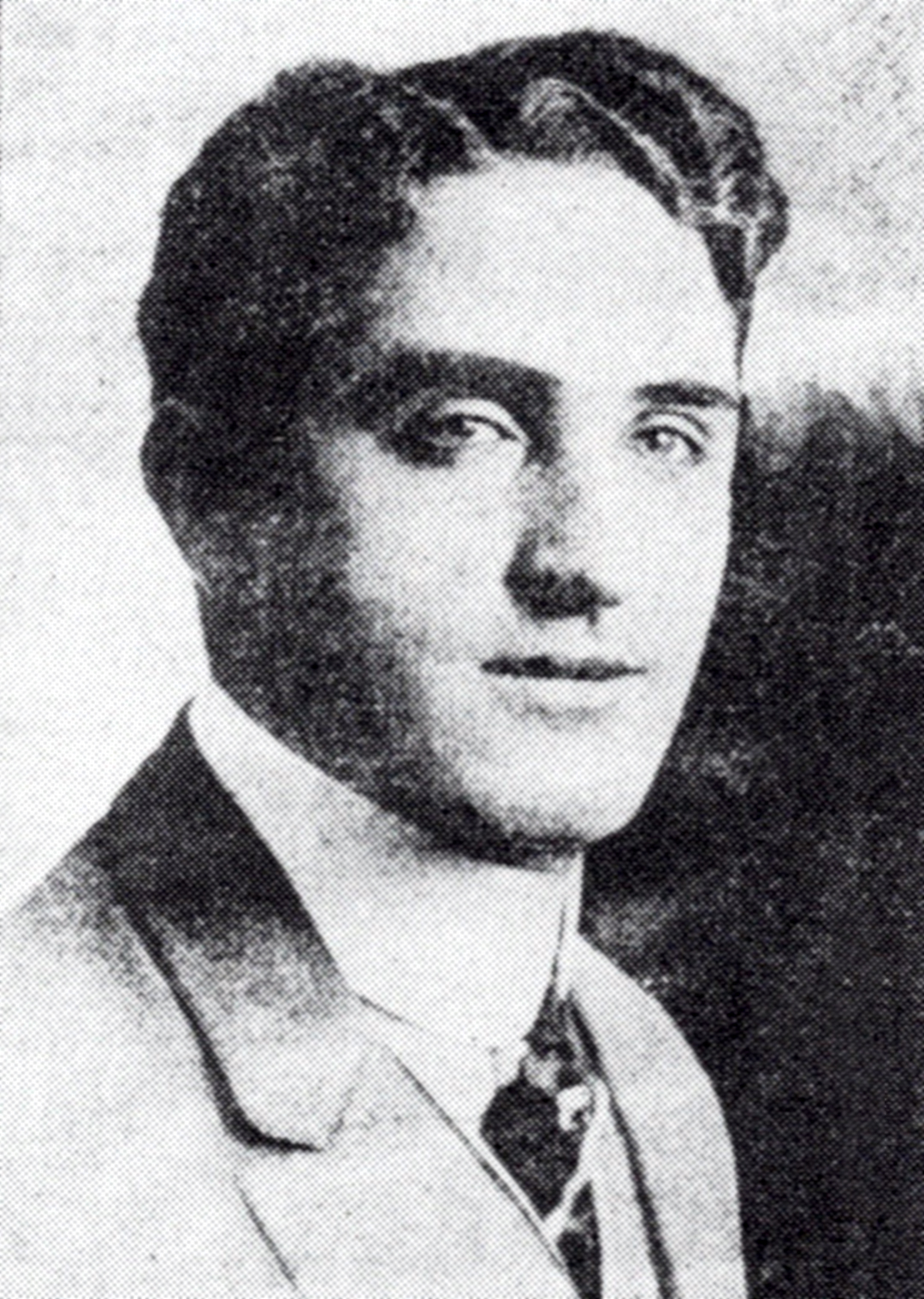
- Gilbert in 1915
- Born: Louis Wolfe Gilbert; August 31, 1886; Odessa, Russian Empire
- Died: July 12, 1970 (aged 83); Los Angeles, California
- Other name: Wolfie Gilbert
- Occupation: Songwriter
- Years active: 1912–1945
- Children: Doris Gilbert
- Musical career
- Genre: Traditional pop

Louis Wolfe Gilbert (August 31, 1886 – July 12, 1970) was a Russian-born American songwriter of Tin Pan Alley. He is best remembered as the lyricist for "Ramona" (1928), the first movie theme song ever written.

== Biography ==
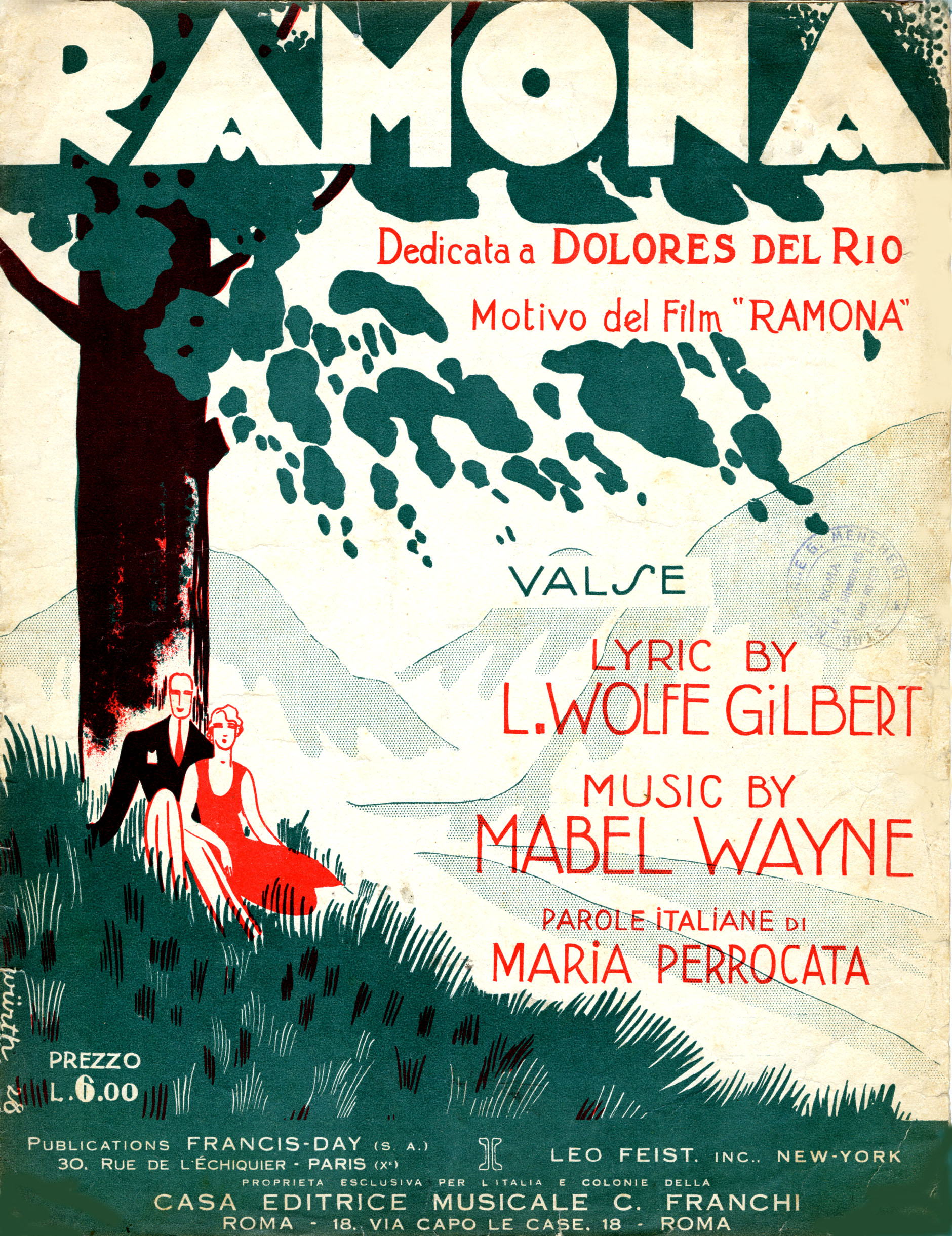
"Ramona" (1928), by Gilbert and Mabel Wayne, was the first theme song ever written for the movies.

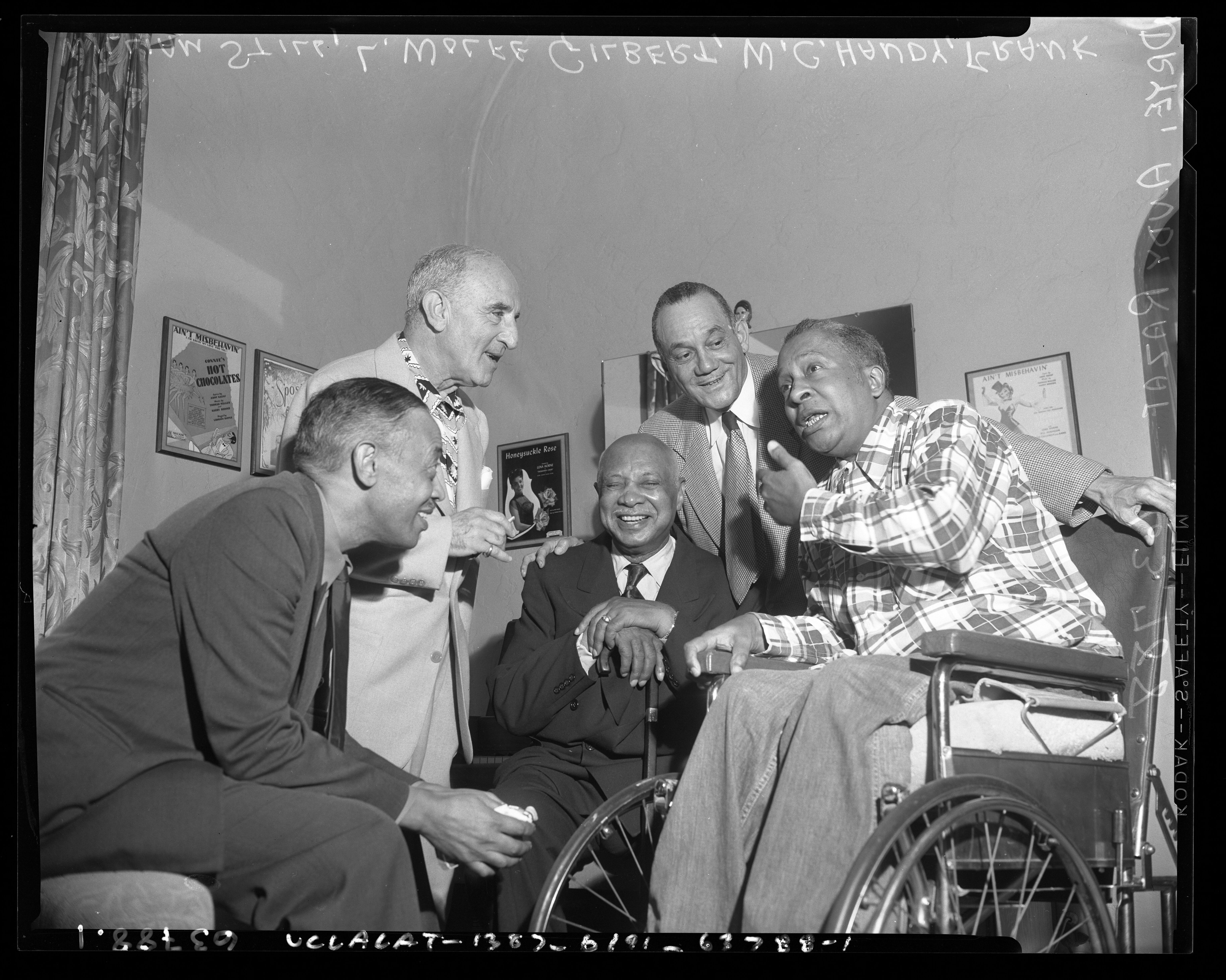
William Grant Still, Gilbert, W. C. Handy, Frank Drye and Andy Razaf in Los Angeles in 1954

Gilbert (far right) in 1966

Born in Odessa in the Russian Empire (present-day Ukraine), Gilbert moved to the United States as a young man.

Gilbert began his career touring with John L. Sullivan and singing in a quartet at small Coney Island café called College Inn, where he was discovered by English producer Albert Decourville. Decourville brought him to London as part of The Ragtime Octet.

Gilbert's first songwriting success came in 1912, when F. A. Mills Music Publishers published his song "Waiting For the Robert E. Lee" (melody by composer Lewis F. Muir). Gilbert later wrote both the words and music to "Down Yonder", a sequel to "Waiting for the Robert E. Lee". "Down Yonder" has become something of a standard as an instrumental, though the lyrics are rarely performed.

He joined ASCAP in 1924.

Gilbert moved to Hollywood in 1929, and began writing for film, television, and radio (including the Eddie Cantor show).

During the 1930s, Gilbert worked on Cuban songs that helped to popularize the rumba in America. Some of these hits for which he wrote English lyrics include "The Peanut Vendor", "Mama Inez", and "Maria My Own".

Gilbert wrote the theme lyrics for the popular children's Television Western Hopalong Cassidy, which first aired in 1949 on NBC. He was an innovator in his field, having been one of the first songwriters to begin publishing and promoting a catalog of his own works. He served as the director of ASCAP from 1941 to 1944, and again in 1953. He was inducted into the Songwriters Hall of Fame in 1970.

Known as "Wolfie", Gilbert and his wife Kate (nee Oestreicher) lived in Beverly Hills, and he and his family were members of Temple Israel of Hollywood. After Kate's passing he married Rose Hirschfield.

He died in Los Angeles, California on July 12, 1970. His original gravesite was at Hillside Memorial Park Cemetery in Culver City (Mausoleum, Court of Sages, Crypt 223) but he was later reinterred at Forest Lawn Cemetery (Cathedral City) near Palm Springs, California.

== Songs ==
- 1906 "My Own Iona" (music by Anatol Friedland and Carey Morgan, arr. by D. Onivas/Domenico Savino)
- 1912 "Waiting for the Robert E. Lee" (music by Lewis F. Muir)
- 1912 "Hitchy-Koo" (music by Lewis F. Muir and Maurice Abrahams, recorded by Collins & Harlan)
- 1912 "Ragging the Baby to Sleep" (music by Lewis F. Muir)
- 1912 "Take Me to that Swanee Shore" (music by Lewis F. Muir)
- 1913 "Mammy Jinny's Mubilee" (music by Lewis F. Muir)
- 1914 "By Heck" (music by S. R. Henry)
- 1914 "She's Dancing Her Heart Away" (music by Kerry Mills)
- 1915 "My Sweet Adair" (music by Anatole Friedland)
- 1916 "I Miss You Miss America" (music by Lee S. Roberts)
- 1916 "I've Got the Army Blues" (with Carey Morgan)
- 1916 "My Hawaiian Sunrise" (music by Carey Morgan, recorded by Henry Burr and Albert C. Campbell)
- 1917 "Are You From Heaven?" (music by Anatole Friedland)
- 1917 "Camouflage" (with Anatole Friedland)
- 1917 "Lily of the Valley" (music by Anatole Friedland)
- 1917 "Set Aside Your Tears (Till the Boys Come Marching Home)" (with Malvin Franklin and Anatole Friedland )
- 1921 "Down Yonder"
- 1924 "O, Katharina" (music by Richard Fall)
- 1925 "Don't Wake Me Up, Let Me Dream" (music by Mabel Wayne)
- 1925 "I Miss My Swiss" (music by Abel Baer)
- 1926 "Hello, Aloha, How Are You?" (music by Abel Baer)
- 1927 "Lucky Lindy!" (music by Abel Baer)
- 1928 "Are You Thinking of Me Tonight?" (music by Harry Akst and Benny Davis, recorded by Al Bowlly with John Abriani's Six)
- 1928 "Ramona" (music by Mabel Wayne, recorded by Whispering Jack Smith, Paul Whiteman Orchestra featuring Bix Beiderbecke, and Gene Austin)
- 1928 "Jeannine, I Dream of Lilac Time" (music by Nathaniel Shilkret, recorded by over a hundred artists)
- 1928 "Zindele Meins" ("Zindele mayns"), the Yiddish version of "Sonny Boy" sung by Pesach Burstein
- 1929 "My Mother's Eyes" (music by Abel Baer)
- 1931 "Marta" (music by Moises Simons, recorded by (Arthur Tracy, The Street Singer)
- 1931 "Mama Inez" (music Eliseo Grenet)

== Lyrics for Broadway productions ==
- 1912 The Girl from Brighton
- 1912–1913 (From) Broadway to Paris
- 1916–1917 The Century Girl
- 1917 Doing Our Bit
- 1919 Oh, What A Girl!
- 1931 The Singing Rabbi

== Gilbert & Friedland ==
Gilbert & Friedland was a music publishing partnership between composer, performer, and songwriter Anatole Friedland (also sometimes spelled Anatol Friedland and Anato Friedland) and lyricist L. Wolfe Gilbert.

- "Are You from Heaven?"
- "Then You Can Come Back to Me" (1918)
- "While You're Away" (1918)
- "That Beloved Cheater of Mine", from film The Beloved Cheater
- "Singapore (1918), Rector Novelty Orchestra, a ragtime song
- "Shades of Gray"
- "Love is a Wonderful Thing"
