= Domenico Savino =

Italian conductor (1882–1973)

Domenico Savino (1882 – 1973) was an Italian conductor. "Onivas" is his surname spelled backwards.

== Early life and education ==
He was born into an artistic family in Taranto, Italy at the end of the 19th century, and migrated to the United States in the early years of the 20th century.

Savino's classical education in music was completed at the Royal Conservatory of Naples in not only composition and piano, but also in conducting for which he became famous in the United States working ultimately for Pathe Records, Kapp and RCA in these regards.

== Career ==
Early in his career in the United States, Savino brought to the U.S. the famous silent motion picture star, Rudolph Valentino.

At various times, Savino conducted the CBS Symphony, orchestrated by Paul Whiteman - the famous "Big Band" leader - and Vincent Lopez. Savino became one of the "Big Three" partners in the American music publishing firm, Robbins Music. Many of Domenico Savino's popular pieces are published under the pseudonym "D. Onivas," which was simply a reversal of his last name. Savino is credited with composing over 2500 published compositions, most of which are classical or semi-classical in nature, and is responsible for adapting "Moonlight Love" from Debussy's Clair de Lune. Domenico arranged for many of the most famous names in the music industry during the 1920s through the 1940s, including Hugo Winterhalter and Mitchell Ayres.

== Later life and death ==
Savino, in his later years, recorded substantially with the Rome Symphony Orchestra for the company Thomas J. Valentino Inc., which operated a music library in New York until it closed in 2008. Many of Domenico's original compositions are still available online.
