= Dan Mace =

American harness racing driver and horse trainer (1834–1885)

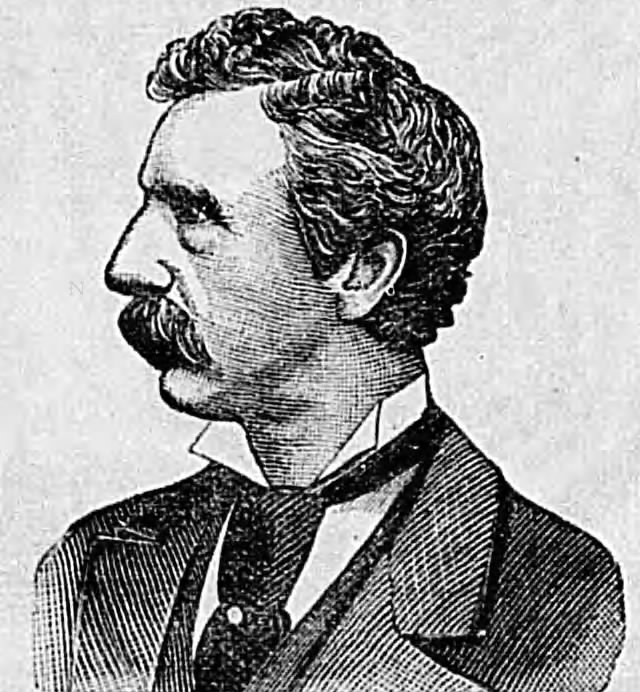

Personal information
- Nickname: The Wizard of the Reins
- Born: Daniel Mace; May 28, 1834 Cambridge, Massachusetts, U.S.
- Died: April 19, 1885 (aged 50) New York City, New York, U.S.
- Occupations: Harness racing driver; horse trainer

Horse racing career
- Sport: Harness racing

Honors
- U.S. Harness Racing Hall of Fame (1977)

Daniel Mace (May 28, 1834 – April 19, 1885) was an American harness racing jockey and horse trainer. He was inducted into the U.S. Harness Racing Hall of Fame in 1977.

== Early life ==
Mace was born on May 28, 1834, in Cambridge, Massachusetts, United States.

Named after his father, an owner of a Boston livery stable, he carried on the family tradition of horsemanship. His brother, Ben Mace, was also a horseman.

== Career ==
Raised in Boston, Mace was taught to race by his father and prominent trainer Cosgrove. As a youth, Mace lived with Elijah Simmons in Albany and rode most of his races during the 1843–44 seasons under trainer Benjamin Reed. After returning home, he devoted himself to trotting horses, staying in Boston. In his early days, Mace managed many noted horses, including Kate Miller, Mary Taylor, Touch-Me-Not, Old Bones, Duchess, Meddlesome, Tom Hyer, Dentist, Lady Westley, and several others.

In 1850, Mace guided Lady Litchfield to her first major win at the Cambridge course. After buying her in 1851, he went on to win additional races at Washington Trotting Park in Providence.

Mace earned his first big purse in May 1855, driving Chicago Jack to a $500 win over Knownothing after dropping the first heat and winning the next three. He relocated to Providence, Rhode Island, in 1856. At Washington Park, Mace drove his mare Duchess to a ten-mile win in 29:17. After driving Lady Sherman for Mr. Parkis in 1857, Mace purchased her in partnership with Mr. Babcock and brought her to New York, where she won a $100 race at the Fashion Course.

Mace first handled the famed champion Ethan Allen in 1858. His first time driving the horse that year came in a trot against George M. Patchen over the Union Course. He was at the reins when Ethan Allen faced Dexter and later in his race with The Rose of Washington. In partnership with J. Dunn Walton, he purchased a fourteen-year-old Ethan Allen from Frank Baker and drove him in several record races.

Between 1858 and 1860, Mace campaigned the black gelding Pilot, recording his fastest mile of 2:28 in September 1859 at Providence against Miller's Damsel.

Mace later took charge of Daniel Lambert, a speedy three-year-old son of Ethan Allen sent by owner John Porter of Ticonderoga, New York. At the Old Saugus Race Track in Massachusetts, on October 22, 1861, Daniel Lambert won two heats, one in a record 2:42, prompting Mace to challenge any three-year-old trotter in the world for $5,000 or $10,000 a side.

He moved to Chicago, Illinois in 1862 and soon established himself at the Fashion Course.

Mace drove Ethan Allen and Honest Allen as a team in 1862, beating Simon Browne's Toronto Chief and running mate in 2:33 at the Fashion Course. He later drove the stallions in a timed trial, recording 2:23½ under the watch of several prominent horsemen.

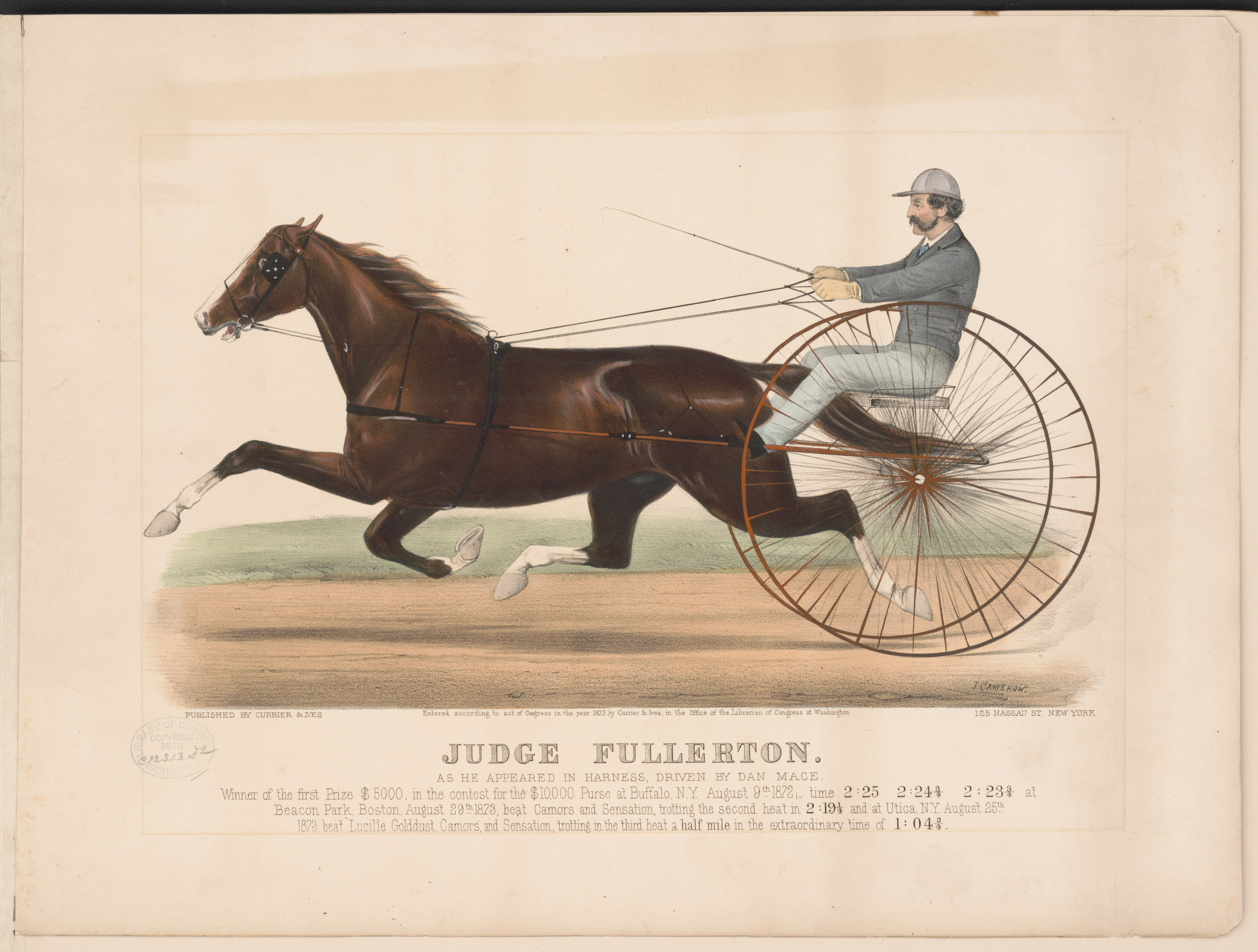
Judge Fullerton, as he appeared in harness, driven by Dan Mace, Currier & Ives, 1873

On June 25, 1862, Mace drove General Butler to victory over Panic to wagon, with times of 2:29 and 2:28¾.

Between 1863 and 1870, Mace handled horses such as Gen. Butler, Shark, Pocahontas, Fearnaught, Commodore Vanderbilt, Prince, Gray Mack, Quaker, Kittie, Wink, Billy Barr, Sorrel Dan, Young Woeful, Rhode Island, and John Morgan.

Mace trained the bay gelding Shark who was sired by Hambletonian 10, and first raced him against Frank Temple, winning around $5,000. On May 18, 1864, Dan Mace took the reins of Shark to race in harness at the Fashion Course against Dexter and Lady Shannon in mile heats, best three of five.

Mace guided Commodore Vanderbilt to a win against John Crooks and George Wilkes at the Union Course on November 6, 1865.

At the Fashion Course on June 21, 1867, Mace guided Ethan Allen and his running mate to victory over Dexter in a sulky, sweeping three heats in remarkable times of 2:15, 2:16, and 2:19. It was later captured in a lithograph by Currier & Ives in 1872.

In 1868, at Buffalo's first $10,000 class race, Mace drove Fearnaught to a decisive win in the 2:30 class. His first heat in 2:23¼ lowered the stallion record of 2:23½, by George M. Patchen that had stood for eight years.

Mace bought Lady Thorne for $20,000 in May 1870, and on July 4 she won her debut under his direction at Prospect Park, sweeping three heats against George Wilkes and others. He drove Lady Thorne to 2:10¼ in a private trial that year, timed by two veteran turfmen. Mace believed that she had the ability to trot faster than 2:10 if conditioned for a single fast mile.

During the early 1870s, Mace was entrusted with training and driving the trotter Judge Fullerton. In front of 8,000 spectators at East Saginaw's famed trotting course on July 18, 1874, Mace drove Judge Fullerton in a match against Budd Doble and Goldsmith Maid, who took the victory in 2:16.

In 1878, Mace drove Hopeful to what was then the fastest wagon record ever recorded.

By 1880, Mace, having broken his collarbone in a sulky accident at St. Paul, Minnesota, withdrew from active participation in trotting races.

Mace, in 1882, handled William Henry Vanderbilt's trotters William H. and Lysander, driving them in double harness to two 2:20 finishes. Vanderbilt's mares Maude S., Aldine, and Early Rose were placed under his care in 1883 and trialed as teams.

He made his final appearance as a driver in the 1884 season at the Fleetwood Park Racetrack, where he drove St. Julien.

== Death ==
Mace died on April 19, 1885, in New York City, New York, United States.

On May 23, 1885, Mace's driving horses and equipment were auctioned in New York, yielding $5,140 for 18 horses and $1,360 for wagons and harnesses. Adonis, a 12-year-old black stallion by Ethan Allen, fetched $1,000. Ex-Judge Fullerton paid $925 for Fancy (2:31¼) and $300 for Lady Lovering. Leda, by Aberdeen, with a 2:25½ record, sold for $625 and the bay stallion Pelham sold for $380.

== Legacy ==
Known as "The Wizard of the Reins," Mace drew the largest public following of any driver from 1865 to 1885, aside from Hiram Woodruff. Mace set records driving Ethan Allen (2:25½), Fearnaught (2:23¼), Judge Fullerton (2:18), Hopeful (2:14¾), and Darby (2:16½).

The New York-based lithography firm Currier & Ives produced a print of the pacer Sorrel Dan, driven by Mace in 1880.

Mace was a skilled driver and an expert judge of pace, often knowing by the half-mile pole whether to push for a win or conserve his horse. John Splan, a successful driver, credited his early training to Mace and adopted many of his techniques. Mace discovered that using goggles could help correct the vision problems of a horse when he first used them on the stallion Fearnaught.

Mace was inducted into the Immortals category of the United States Harness Racing Hall of Fame in 1977.

== Gallery ==
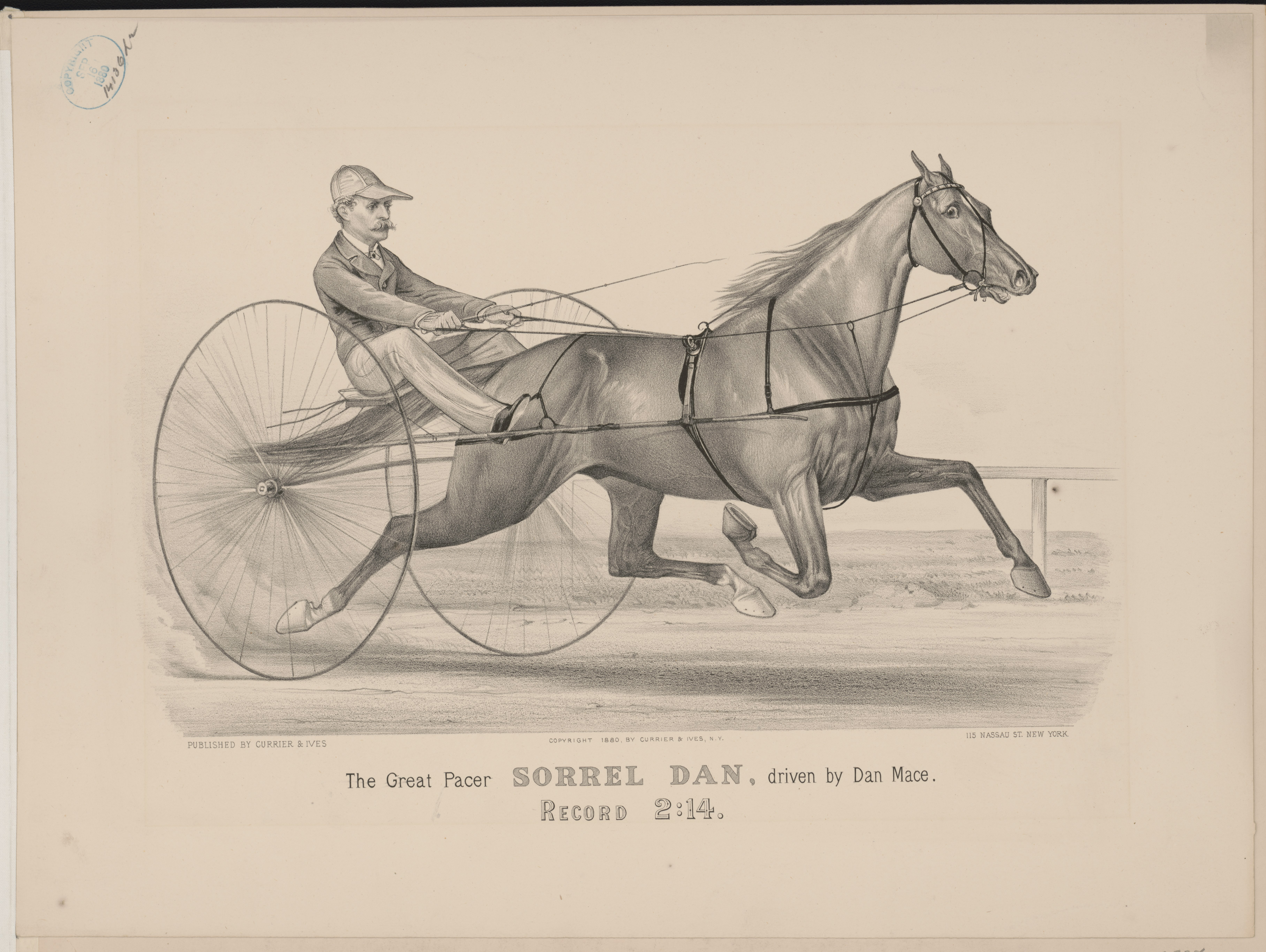
The great pacer Sorrel Dan, driven by Dan Mace, c. 1880
