= Fashion Course =

Former horse racing course in Corona, Queens, New York City

Coordinates: 40°45′12″N 73°51′52″W

- Interactive map of Fashion Course
- Location: Corona, Queens, New York City, New York, U.S.
- Owned by: Fashion Course Association
- Date opened: 1854
- Course type: Harness racing

Fashion Course, formerly known as the National Race Course, was a harness racing track located in Corona, Queens, New York City.

== History ==
First known as the National Race Course in 1854, the course was renamed in 1856 after the renowned Thoroughbred racemare Fashion. The Fashion Course was established along the Long Island route connecting Newton (now Elmhurst, Queens) with Flushing, Queens. Situated in West Flushing (now Corona, Queens), the track was laid out between the Long Island Rail Road tracks and Jackson Avenue (now Northern Boulevard). The site was about a mile and a half from where the baseball stadium Citi Field now stands.

The one-mile oval was known as America's only racecourse measured exactly to 5,280 feet. It was enclosed by a costly brick wall, wide at the base, narrowing to a single brick at the top, and capped with sharp shards of glass set in cement to deter climbers. It featured a grandstand and was bordered by a large hotel, multiple buildings, and long stables for racing stock. The track drew New York and Brooklyn's affluent crowd and hosted the day's finest racehorses.

Many notable races featuring the finest trotting horses of the time established the Fashion Course's reputation. In 1859, a historic trot for $2,000 between Flora Temple, driven by D. Tallman, and Ethan Allen, driven by Hiram Woodruff, drew a crowd of 12,000 to 15,000. The audience, which included many high-ranking members of society, hailed the event as one of the most impressive in American racing.

By 1862, a new road from Hunter's Point, Queens (now Long Island City), allowed easy access to the Fashion Course.

Throughout its history, the Fashion Course hosted many record-breaking performances. General Butler posted records of 2:21½ (1862) and 2:21 (1863) with Smith Burr driving, before Dexter cut the time to 2:18¼ in 1865 and to 2:18 in 1866.

After the Fashion Course Association's lease expired in March 1866, Joseph Crocheron became the sole proprietor of the Fashion Course, having been connected to its management for five years.

Dexter, a favorite of the track, soon set a record of 2:16 3/8, considered his best performance over the Fashion Course. His stall drew daily crowds, where fans admired the famous trotter. The Fashion Course hosted one of its greatest match races on June 21, 1867, between Dexter, guided by Budd Doble, and Ethan Allen, driven by Dan Mace. Twenty thousand people attended the match arranged for a $2,000 purse.

George Wilkes' Spirit of the Times announced the Spirit of the Times Stake, a $500-entry race for foals of 1865 to trot in 1868. Due to demand, Wilkes launched the $5,150 Long Island Stake for 1864 colts and fillies, set for October 10, 1867, on the same plan, which received 16 subscriptions. The first Spirit of the Times Stake took place at the course on October 7, 1868, with the second held on October 12, 1869.

At the Fashion Course on July 12, 1869, American Girl and Lady Thorn competed in a highly anticipated race between two of the fastest horses in America. The event drew immense excitement in sporting circles, attracting around 12,000 spectators and a large carriage concourse, rivaling the famed Dexter-Ethan Allen race.

== Other sports ==
On July 20, 1858, the Fashion Course hosted its first baseball game of a best-of-three series between all-star teams from the City of New York and Brooklyn. The Fashion Course series marked the first all-star game, first enclosed park match, and first paid entry in the history of professional sports. Between 4,000 and 10,000 spectators attended the July 20 series opener. The second game of the historic all-star series at the Fashion Course took place on August 17, 1858. The third and final game, played September 10, 1858, introduced paid entry, using the enclosed grounds and gated access to charge admission. Spectators paid to see a baseball game for the first time in the sport's history.

== Closure ==
The Newtown and Flushing Railroad, laid out by Oliver Charlick in 1871, was routed through the race track, marking the end of the Fashion Course.

== Gallery ==
Fashion Course, West Flushing, 1859
