= Daniel Mace =

Daniel Mace may refer to:

- Daniel Mace (politician) (1811–1867), U.S. Representative from Indiana
- Daniel Mace (biblical scholar) (died c. 1753), English textual critic of the New Testament
- Dan Mace (1834–1885), American harness racing jockey and horse trainer
