= 1920 Brooklyn Royal Giants season =

1920 Brooklyn Royal Giants
- League: Negro league baseball
- Ballpark: Dexter Park
- City: Queens
- Record: 13–7–2 (.636)
- League place: 1st
- Owners: Nat Strong
- Managers: John Henry Lloyd

The 1920 Brooklyn Royal Giants baseball team represented the Brooklyn Royal Giants as an independent during the 1920 baseball season. The team compiled a 13–7–2 (.636) record and won the Eastern independent championship. Nat Strong was the team's owner, and John Henry Lloyd was the manager. The team played its home games at Dexter Park in Queens.

The team's leading batters were:

- Manager/shortstop John Henry Lloyd - .305 batting average in 22 games
- First baseman Eddie Douglass - .279 batting average in 22 games

The team's leading pitchers were Harry Kenyon (3–1, 2.65 ERA) and Jesse Hubbard (3–2, 3.19 ERA, 41 strikeouts).
