= List of Brooklyn Royal Giants seasons =

This list of Brooklyn Royal Giants seasons compiles games played by the Brooklyn Royal Giants. Seasons in which the Royal Giants were league members (or an associate team), only games that counted in official league standings are included. Seasons in which they had no league membership and played an independent/barnstorming schedule include games against primarily major-league-caliber teams.

Contemporary coverage of games and standings was spotty and inconsistent. Ongoing research continuously discovers unreported or misreported games, while some games are probably lost forever. Therefore, Negro league seasonal finishes will likely remain incomplete and subjective.

== Year by year ==
Negro World Series Champions (1924–1927 & 1942–1948) *	League champions ‡	Other playoff ^

Season	Level	League	Season finish		Games	Wins	Loses	Ties	Win% (Note: Placement in annual standings were generally decided by win percentage; "games behind" were never used.)	Postseason	Ref
Season	Level	League	Full (Note: Finish in years when only a full season was indicates actual place in standings. Finish in years a split season was played indicates combined place in standings for both halves of the season.)	Split (Note: Years with a "—" did not play a split season. "1st" or 2nd" indicate which half of the season was won. "DNQ" indicates team did not win either half and did not qualify for postseason.)	Games	Wins	Loses	Ties	Win%	Postseason	Ref
Brooklyn Royal Giants
1904	Independent	—	—	—	5	0	5	0	.000		
1905^	Independent	—	—	—	13	0	12	1	.000	Lost challenge to East-region championship (Philadelphia Giants) 3–0	
1906	Independent	—	—	—	29	15	13	1	.536		
1907	Minor	NA	3	—	27	12	14	1	.462		
1908‡	Minor	NA	1	—	30	19	10	1	.655	Won pennant outright	
1909‡	Minor	NA	1	—	12	9	3	0	.750	Won pennant outright	
1910	Independent	—	—	—	13	9	4	0	.692		
1911	Independent	—	—	—	23	12	10	1	.545		
1912	Independent	—	—	—	25	10	15	0	.400		
1913	Independent	—	—	—	24	13	11	0	.542		
1914	Independent	—	—	—	33	14	19	0	.424		
1915	Independent	—	—	—							
1916	Independent	—	—	—	26	16	10	0	.615		
1917	Independent	—	—	—	29	13	15	1	.464		
1918	Independent	—	—	—	25	12	13	0	.480		
1919	Independent	—	—	—	17	4	13	0	.235		
1920^	Independent	—	—	—	22	13	7	2	.650	Lost challenge to East-region championship (Hilldale Club) 0–2–2	
1921	Independent	—	—	—	13	5	8	0	.385		
1922	Independent	—	—	—	10	6	4	0	.600		
1923	Major	ECL	3	—	33	16	16	1	.500		
1924	Major	ECL	6	—	41	15	25	1	.375		
1925	Major	ECL	5	—	35	14	20	1	.412		
1926	Major	ECL	7	—	35	11	24	0	.314		
1927	Major	ECL	7	DNQ	34	11	23	0	.324		
1928	Independent	—	—	—	10	4	6	0	.400		
1929	Independent	—	—	—	7	3	4	0	.429		
1930	Independent	—	—	—	13	2	11	0	.154		
1931	Independent	—	—	—	2	0	2	0	.000		
1932	Independent	—	—	—							
1933	Independent	—	—	—	1	1	0	0	1.000		
1934	Independent	—	—	—							
1935	Independent	—	—	—							
1936	Independent	—	—	—	5	1	4	0	.200		
1937	Independent	—	—	—	3	2	0	1	1.000		
1938	Independent	—	—	—							
1939	Independent	—	—	—							
1940	Independent	—	—	—							
1941	Independent	—	—	—							
1942	Independent	—	—	—							

Key
