= Fleetwood Park Racetrack =

19th-century racetrack in New York City, US

Fleetwood Park
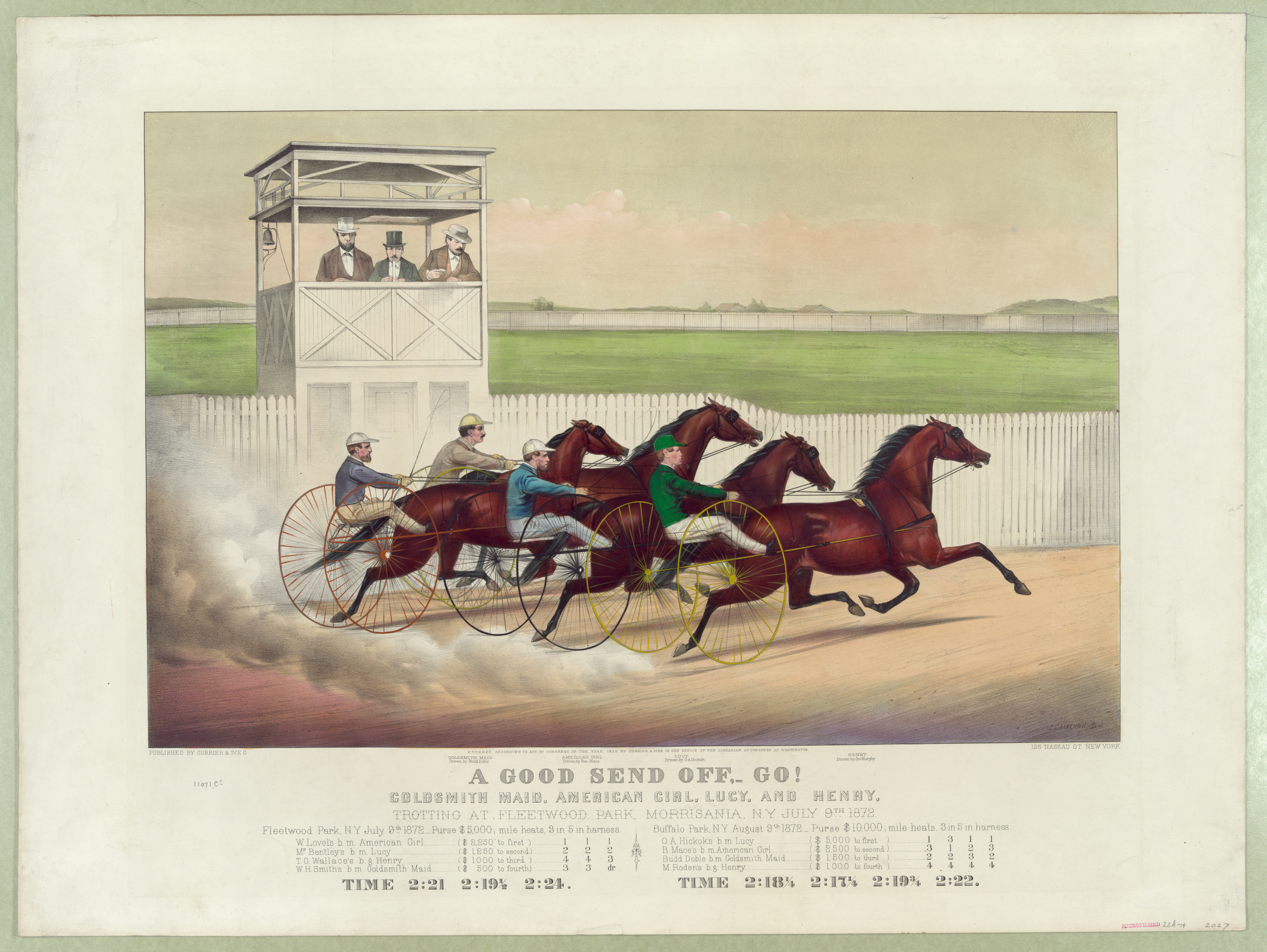
- A Good Send Off,_Go!. Lithograph, Currier and Ives, 1872 (New York)
- Interactive map of Fleetwood Park
- Location: Morrisania, Bronx, New York, US
- Coordinates: 40.830°N 73.915°W
- Operated by: New York Driving Club
- Date opened: June 8, 1871
- Date closed: January 1, 1898; 128 years ago
- Race type: Trotting

Fleetwood Park was a 19th-century harness racing (trotting) track in what is now the Morrisania section of the Bronx in New York, United States. The races held there were a popular form of entertainment, drawing crowds as large as 10,000 from the surrounding area. The one-mile (1.6 km) course described an unusual shape, with four turns in one direction and one in the other. For the last five years of operation, Fleetwood was part of trotting's Grand Circuit, one travel guide calling it "the most famous trotting track in the country".

The track operated under several managements between 1870 and 1898. Most notable was the New York Driving Club, consisting of many wealthy New York businessmen, including members of the Vanderbilt and Rockefeller families as well as former US president Ulysses S. Grant. Robert Bonner, owner and publisher of the New York Ledger, was a member, as was his brother David, who at one time served as president.

For most of its history, the track failed to turn a profit, the shortfall being made up annually from financial assessments of the membership. Economic pressures forced the track to close in 1898, and within two years the property was being subdivided into residential building lots. One of the few remaining vestiges of the track is the meandering route of 167th Street, which runs along a portion of the old racecourse.

== Description ==
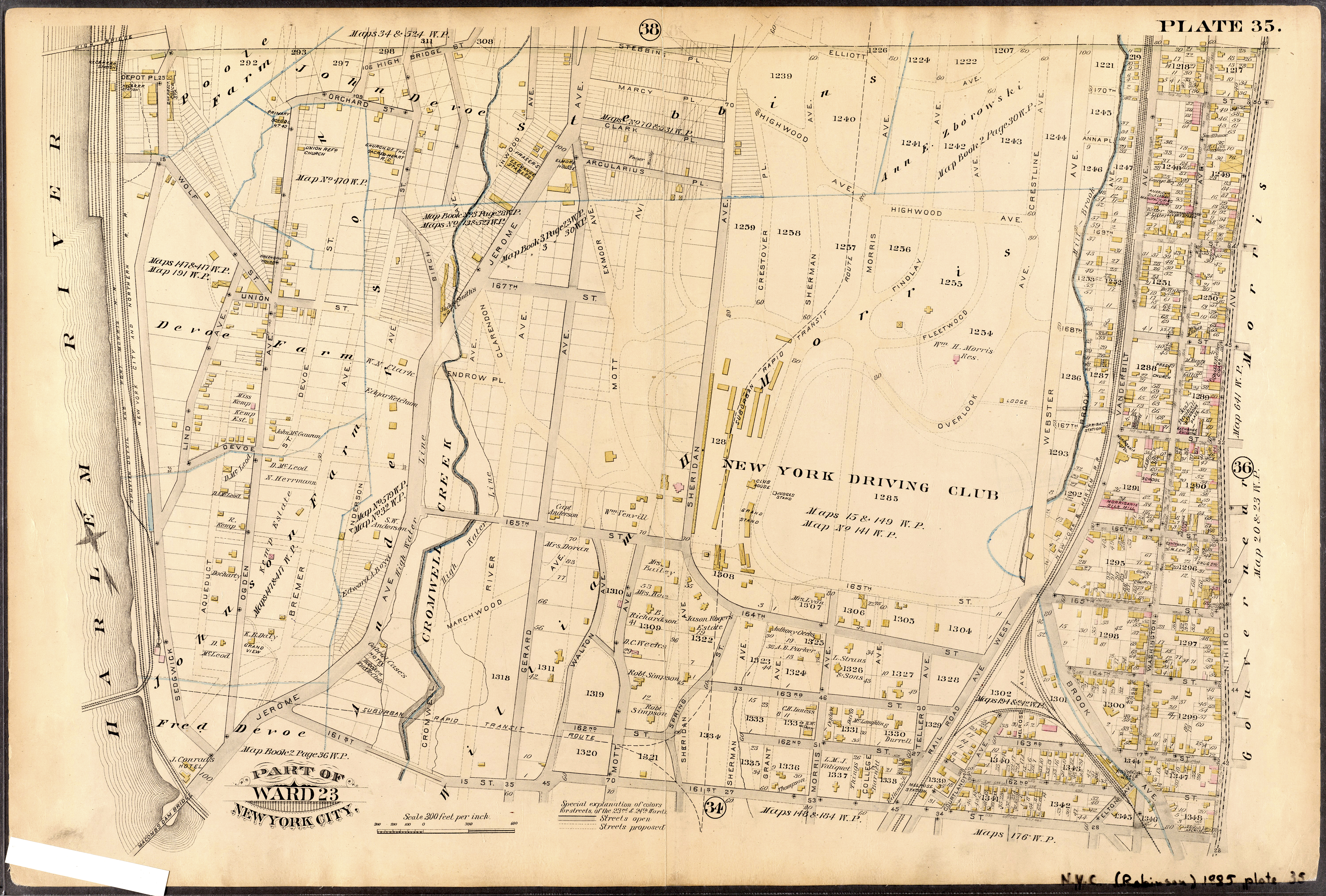
1885 map showing the irregular shape of the racetrack. Proposed streets are shown by dashed lines; what is drawn as Overlook Ave is part of modern-day 167th Street.

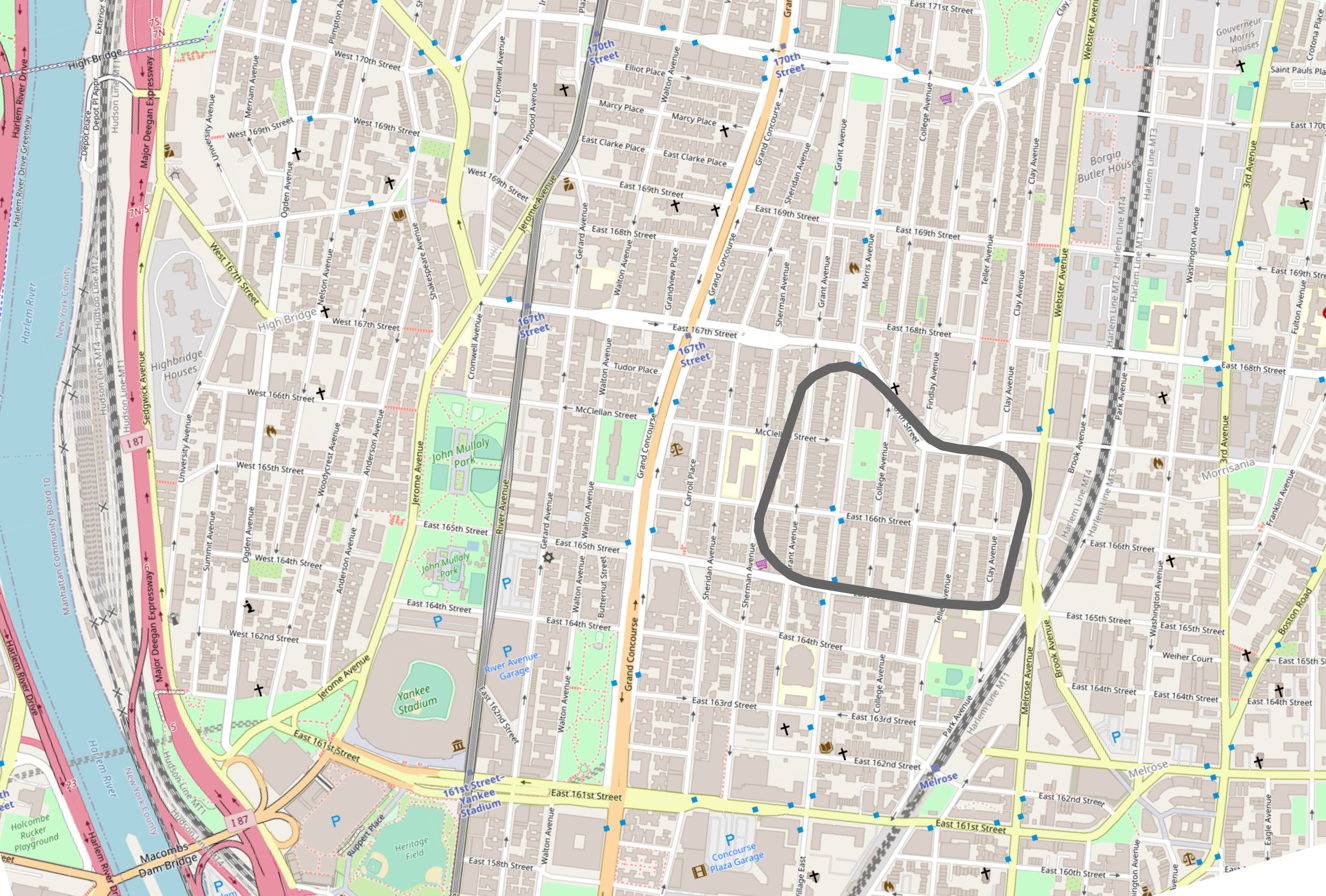
Modern map showing the same area as the 1885 map, with the path of the racecourse outlined

Fleetwood Park was located in the town of Morrisania, Westchester County (now the Morrisania section of the Bronx), on the west side of Railroad (now Park) Avenue. This area lies between Webster and Sheridan Avenues and 165th and 167th Streets on the modern Bronx street grid. The covered grandstand, clubhouse, judges' stand, and other buildings were clustered along the southwest corner of the track, adjacent to Sheridan Avenue. The clubhouse, a French Second Empire–style building, had a view of the track from above. Valentine's Manual described the park as "the broad acres of that well-known rendezvous of all lovers of the turf"; the New York Times variously described the track as "oddly-shaped" and "queer-shaped". An 1885 map shows it as roughly rectangular with a bulge on one side, yielding five turns – four to the left and one to the right, if run counter-clockwise. Modern-day 167th Street diverges from the otherwise rectilinear street grid with the oblique portion of the street following the northern leg of the racecourse. Another oddity was that the track was not level, dropping approximately nine feet (2.7 m) in the first half-mile.

As many as 10,000 spectators attended races at Fleetwood. According to The Sun's Guide to New York (which promoted itself as providing "Suggestions to Sightseers and Practical Information for Practical People") the easiest way to get to the track was by train from Grand Central Depot to Melrose station, a 15-minute trip. People also came by carriage from Manhattan Island, or steamboat from Fulton Market slip in Brooklyn and Peck Slip in Manhattan to the Morrisania dock from which they made connections by horse-drawn coaches.

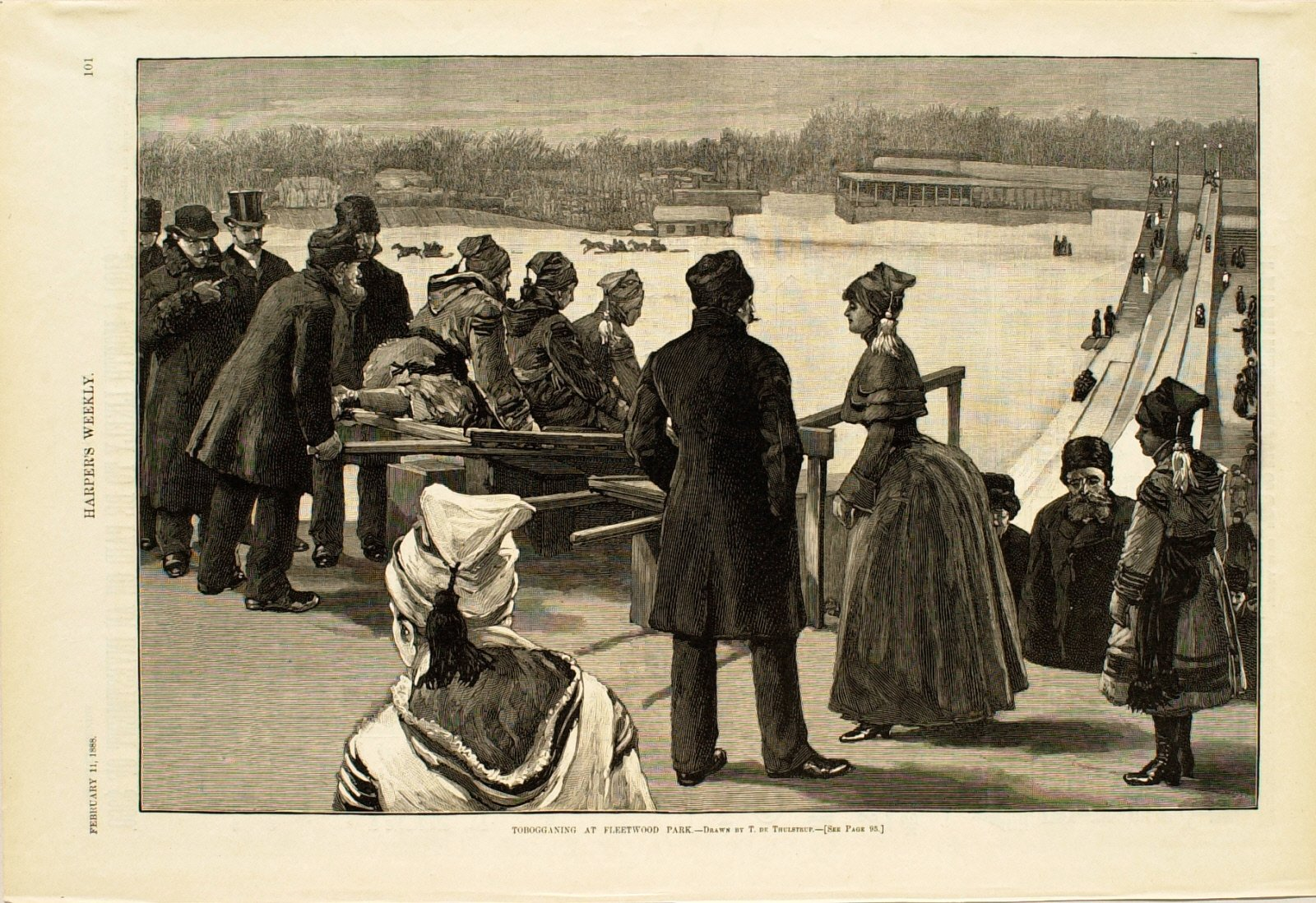
Tobogganing at Fleetwood Park by Thure de Thulstrup, wood engraving on paper, 1888

When races were not being held, the grounds were used for other activities. In 1888, a winter carnival was set up, with toboggan slides, lighting, and music; on other occasions, pigeon shooting contests involving live birds and shotguns were held. An 1897 New York City ordinance forbade the discharge of firearms within the city; Fleetwood Park was noted as one of the specific areas exempted from the prohibition. The exemption was deleted from the ordinance in 1906, as the track was "no longer used as [a] shooting ground". In 1889, Fleetwood Park and nearby Claremont Park were considered as possible sites for an 1892 World's Fair. The fair was to celebrate the 400th anniversary of Christopher Columbus arriving in the New World. In 1890, however, the US Congress designated Chicago as the host city for the World's Columbian Exposition.

== Geology ==
In an 1881 study of the geology of the region, J. D. Dana described Fleetwood Park as "low and nearly flat, except its western side" and theorized this (along with other features of the area) was caused by limestone belts which were subject to easy erosion. Dana writes:

The limestone area No. 2 ... joins that already described through the region of Fleetwood Park ... The northern limit of the belt is about two miles north of McComb's (or Central) Bridge. At this north extremity ... two valleys come up from the south and meet [the more eastern one] passes into Fleetwood Park. The limestone of Morrisania extends westward over three-fourths of Fleetwood Park and then northward ... The high land between the two valleys forming the western side of Fleetwood Park consists mainly of schist.

== History ==
=== Before Fleetwood Park ===
Horses had been raced in the Fleetwood Park area as early as 1750, on a racecourse built by Staats Long Morris who took advantage of the relatively level land. The exact location of his track is unclear; it may have occupied the site which eventually became Fleetwood Park, or it may have been further north, adjacent to what is now Claremont Park. It is unknown how long the Morris track lasted, and there is no further record of racing in the immediate area until 1870. Two other racetracks operated in the Bronx at around the same time. Jerome Park, a thoroughbred track, was opened in 1866 and operated until 1890, when it was condemned by the city and the land repurposed to build Jerome Park Reservoir. Morris Park which operated from 1889 to 1904, also for thoroughbreds, was located in what is now the Morris Park neighborhood of the Bronx.

The name Fleetwood has been associated with this area since at least 1850, when the New York Industrial Home Association No. 1 was organized as a cooperative to build homes for "tradesmen, employees, and other persons of small means". "Monticello" was originally chosen as the name for this new settlement, although Fleetwood was one of several in consideration. This was soon changed to "Monticello City", and again in 1851 to "Mount Vernon". By 1852, newspaper advertisements were being placed which referred to the development as "Fleetwood". In 1855, the Harlem Railroad Company was also using the name "Fleetwood" in reference to a new rail station they were considering building in the area. The area around Morris Avenue and 165th Street is still referred to as the Fleetwood neighborhood of the Bronx.

=== Fleetwood Park era ===
In 1870, William Morris leased part of his estate to two brothers, Henry and Philip Dater, for a 20-year term. The Daters opened a racing track on June 8, 1871, on the grounds of what had previously been the Morris estate. At the time, this was still the Town of Morrisania, in Westchester County; it was annexed into New York City as the borough of the Bronx in 1874. The Daters' venture failed and the property reverted to Morris in 1880. It was leased in 1881 to the New York Driving Club (Gentlemen's Driving Association in some sources), who ran the track as Fleetwood Park. The New York Times observed in 1895 that the track had reached 25 years of continuous operation that year, outlasting many of the other trotting tracks of its day. The paper noted that $200,000 (equivalent to $6,700,000 in 2025) (Note: 1634–1699: McCusker, J. J. (1997). How Much Is That in Real Money? A Historical Price Index for Use as a Deflator of Money Values in the Economy of the United States: Addenda et Corrigenda (PDF). American Antiquarian Society. 1700–1799: McCusker, J. J. (1992). How Much Is That in Real Money? A Historical Price Index for Use as a Deflator of Money Values in the Economy of the United States (PDF). American Antiquarian Society. 1800–present: Federal Reserve Bank of Minneapolis. "Consumer Price Index (estimate) 1800–".) had been invested in grading the terrain of the Morris estate to make it suitable for racing. A depression at the southeastern end had been filled and rocks at the northern end had to be removed by rock blasting and cutting. In 1896, the New York Driving Club renewed its lease with a $2,500 (equivalent to $97,000 in 2025) reduction in rent. Pressure from real-estate developers led to the track being closed the next year with the last meeting held on October 8, 1897.

=== Post-closure ===
1: Fleetwood Park, 2: Jerome Park, 3: Yonkers Raceway, 4: Proposed Mount Vernon site, 5: Proposed Pelham Parkway site, 6: Morris Park, 7: Harlem River Speedway

The track was permanently closed on January 1, 1898, when the city began constructing streets on the property. By the end of that month, the New York Driving Club had met to consider building a new track, two possible locations being discussed. One site of 105 acres (42 ha) was near Mount Vernon, served by William's Bridge Road, Boston Road, and the Harlem River Railroad. The other site, with 77.7 acres (31.4 ha), was about 2 miles (3.2 km) closer to the city, along the Bronx and Pelham Parkway, not far from the Morris Park track. The latter was preferred by most of the membership. Alfred De Cordova, who had been elected president, stated:

We intend to give the new city a driving track that will be a credit to it. The grand stand and stables will be as commodious as any in the country, and when the track is completed the horsemen will see old Fleetwood rise phoenixlike, only the new track will be greatly superior to the old.

Cordova noted that while the men in the club were "wealthy enough and ardent enough" they could raise the entire cost of the new track by themselves, four or five members being able to immediately contribute $150,000 (equivalent to $5,800,000 in 2025) the club intended to issue bonds. It was estimated that the total cost to complete the track would be $280,000 (equivalent to $10,800,000 in 2025). Despite these proclamations, by the end of 1898, it was announced that the new track would be built in Yonkers and operated by William H. Clark. The following year, the Empire City Trotting Club began operations at Yonkers Raceway. Dirt from the old track was used to grade and fill the private park being installed by Andrew Carnegie for the new Fifth Avenue residence he was building in Manhattan.

In 1898 (the same year Fleetwood Park closed) the Harlem River Speedway opened. This was a 2.3-mile (3.7 km) public roadway running from 155th Street to Dyckman Street, built on unused land in High Bridge Park along the shoreline of the Manhattan side of the Harlem River. It was intended to be used for trotters (sulkies, ridden horses, and bicycles were all prohibited), and built in lieu of previously approved plans for a trotting track in Central Park. In 1997, the New York Times described the speedway as:

... a $5 million bread-and-circuses project built to serve both the rich – who wanted a racing ground for their fast trotters – and the not-so-rich, who were supposed to watch.

Several years earlier, Robert Bonner had written:

Interest in trotting has not fallen off but owners of horses remain away from Fleetwood because the streets and roads leading to the place are bad and hard on the animals. And another cause for the lack of interest in Fleetwood is the fact that the track is not as good as it might be. But I am sure when the new Speedway is completed there will be a decided revival in trotting.

By the 1910s, motorcar racing had eclipsed trotting and use of the speedway by carriages had fallen to fewer than 100 per day in 1916 and fewer than 20 per day in 1918. Automobiles were allowed onto the speedway in 1919. In the mid-20th century it was incorporated into the modern-day Harlem River Drive.

Within a few years of Fleetwood's closing, the property was divided into building lots by real estate developers. By August 1900, the clubhouse was the only structure left standing, and the Union Republican Club considered moving the building to their newly purchased property on 164th Street. The first part of the property to be developed was the block of Clay Avenue between 165th and 166th Streets, with thirty-two buildings (twenty-eight Warren C. Dickerson–designed semi-detached houses, plus three apartment buildings, and one private residence) erected between 1901 and 1910. In 1994, the New York City Landmarks Preservation Commission designated this block the Clay Avenue Historic District. What is modern-day Teller Avenue was originally named Fleetwood Avenue, after the track. The name was later changed to Teller Avenue, honoring Richard H. Teller, a member of the 1868 commission which authorized the first official street map of Morrisania, published in 1871.

== Operation ==
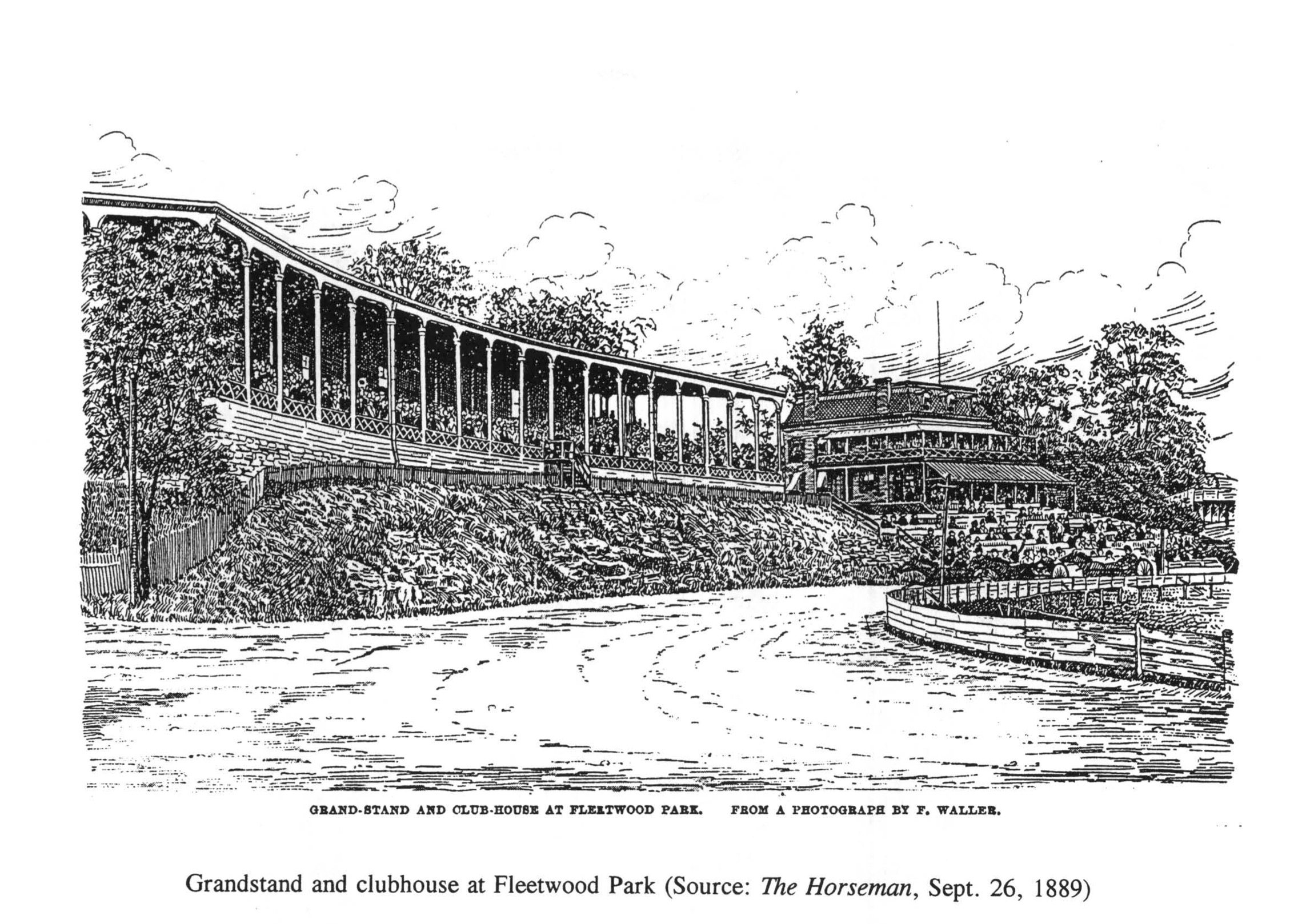
Grandstand and clubhouse. The Horseman, September 26, 1889.

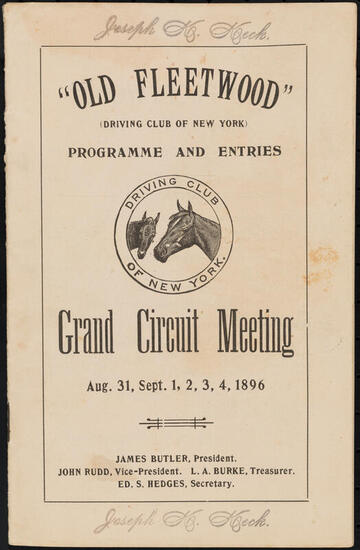
Grand Circuit program, 1896 (New York)

For most of the track's lifetime, trotting races were run on the 1-mile (1.6 km) (one source says 1.25-mile (2.0 km)) oval by the New York Driving Club. In 1892 The Sun's Guide described Fleetwood as "For a time ... the most famous trotting track in the country". The Guide noted, however, that interest in harness racing by horse owners had waned, the track had "gone into a decline" and that the single annual meeting was "not an important meeting", not being part of harness racing's Grand Circuit.

The next year, the New York Driving Club was admitted to the Grand Circuit, along with another club in Detroit. This brought the Grand Circuit up to nine clubs: Pittsburgh, Detroit, Cleveland, Buffalo, Rochester, Springfield (Massachusetts), Hartford, New York, and Philadelphia, allowing it to better compete with the Western-Southern Circuit. The clubs also agreed to increase cooperation with each other and made it more difficult to expand the circuit by requiring a two-thirds vote of existing members to admit any new members. Improvements in preparation for the track's first Grand Circuit meeting included upgrading the grandstand, painting fences, trimming foliage, and enlarging the band stand. A new starter, Frank Walker, was hired with the hopes of speeding up the scoring process.

The Sun's Guide lamented that the track was "famous more for the men who sent their horses there than for great races". Members of the club included William K. Vanderbilt, William Rockefeller, William C. Whitney, Leonard Jerome, Oliver Belmont, Cornelius Bliss, C. Oliver Iselin, Abram Hewitt and Nathan Straus. The membership varied significantly from year to year; reported as over 500 in 1886, it was down to 290 in 1891 and back up to 400 in 1892. Robert Bonner, owner and publisher of the New York Ledger and trotting aficionado had his stables nearby. Robert's younger brother, David, was also a member of the New York Driving Club and at one time served as its president. Robert was well known for paying large sums for horses; in 1884 he bought Maud S. from William H. Vanderbilt (William K.'s father) for $40,000 (equivalent to $1,400,000 in 2025). Five years later, he purchased Sunol from Leland Stanford for an unknown price only disclosed as being higher than that of Maud S.

Other notable attendees included former US president Ulysses S. Grant, who sometimes also drove horses at the track. Grant's skill with horses was well-known; he could ride, drive and train them as required. Modern-day Grant Avenue, named after the president, bisects the old racecourse; the track crossed it at what is now East 164th Street. Also named after the president was the Grant Hotel, frequented by the jockeys. This was located across the contemporary College Avenue from Robert Bonner's house, which was at the foot of modern-day Bonner Place.

Many well-known horses competed at Fleetwood. Perhaps the most famous was Maud S. (1874–1900), who held seven world-record times set over the span of six years. She was renowned for the high price Bonner paid for her. Alix (1888–1901), known as the "Queen of the Turf", was the world trotting champion for six years, and Directum (1889–1909) at one time held the record for fastest heat by a four-year-old. Goldsmith Maid (1857–1885) earned an estimated $364,200 (equivalent to $13,050,000 in 2025) over 13 years, which was a prize-money record for half a century. Jay-Eye-See (1878–1909) and St. Julien (1869–1894) raced against each other on September 29, 1883. Nancy Hanks (1886–1915), owned by John Malcolm Forbes, held a series of world-record times including what the New York Times called "the greatest performance ever made in harness" at Fleetwood on September 1, 1893.

The club lost money most years. In 1893, the New York Times wrote:

Year in and year out the Treasurer of Gotham's driving club has been the one official who has accepted the post with reluctance and relinquished it with a sigh of relief; happy if he could leave his financial statement painfully balanced by an assessment on the members.

The first year of profitable operations was 1893, when the Grand Circuit meeting and "special day profits" provided sufficient income. Major expenses were ground rent ($8,000, equivalent to $290,000 in 2025) and labor ($4,178, equivalent to $150,000 in 2025). Income was mostly from initiation fees, dues, and "transfer members" ($12,225, equivalent to $438,000 in 2025) and stall rent ($4,408, equivalent to $158,000 in 2025). The consolidated meeting and special day earned $1,183 (equivalent to $42,000 in 2025) and $1,077 (equivalent to $39,000 in 2025) respectively. Sale of manure brought in another $10 that year (equivalent to $358 in 2025).

=== Charter Oak Stakes ===
Charter Oak Park, a Grand Circuit harness racing track in Hartford, Connecticut, had opened in 1873. Twenty years later, Charter Oak canceled racing due to a "new law relating to pool selling and purse racing" and the Charter Oaks Stakes, first run in 1883, was transferred to Fleetwood. The Breeder and Sportsman wrote:

Fleetwood will see very lively days this season. After much deliberation the Driving Club, of New York, and the Charter Oak Club, of Hartford, have decided to consolidate their Grand Circuit meetings this year and to have them decided at the New York track, August 28th to September 4th. This combination will result in one of the grandest trotting meetings ever held in the world, and it will certainly surpass anything New York has ever before been treated to.

Two weeks later editor Joseph Simpson explained in the same publication:

Several of the State Legislatures have recently manifested an inclination to abolish racing in all its forms, because of the abuses to which it had been subject. Restrictive laws have been passed in Maine, in Connecticut, in New Jersey, and in Illinois ... In Connecticut the feeling became so powerful that the Legislature absolutely prohibited any public contests of skill or speed in which a premium is awarded. Horses cannot, in that State, trot either in purse or stake races, and the Charter Oak Association, one of the greatest trotting organizations in America, has been under the necessity of trotting its races at Fleetwood.

The next year, the race was back at Charter Oak but, unlike all previous Grand Circuit meetings, with no betting at the track. The gate admission fee was waived in an attempt to draw spectators.

=== Incidents ===
On January 12, 1870, two men were seriously injured when a blasting charge exploded prematurely. The men had prepared the charge and were about to ignite it when it exploded for unknown reasons. On March 2, 1870, there was another explosion. Nitroglycerin—being used to clear rocks the previous day—had leaked into rock fissures beyond the intended location; this exploded when a crowbar caused a spark. One man was killed and several others were seriously injured.

The track also suffered fire damage. On June 15, 1873, an early morning fire in the stables destroyed 48 stalls, causing an estimated $12,000 (equivalent to $323,000 in 2025) damage to the building, plus unknown damages to sulkies and other racing gear. Two horses worth a total of $11,000 (equivalent to $296,000 in 2025) were killed. Another fire, on October 15, 1893, was discovered at 8:00 am. Two horses, one worth $10,000 (equivalent to $358,000 in 2025), perished; another horse and his keeper were injured. Total damages to the buildings and horses was $20,000 (equivalent to $538,000 in 2025). Forty stalls were destroyed which the club intended to rebuild along with an additional 25 to 30 stalls, bringing the total to about 300. (Note: The cited source refers to "The fire last November". This appears to be an error and should say "October".)
