= Dexter (horse) =

American-bred Standardbred racehorse

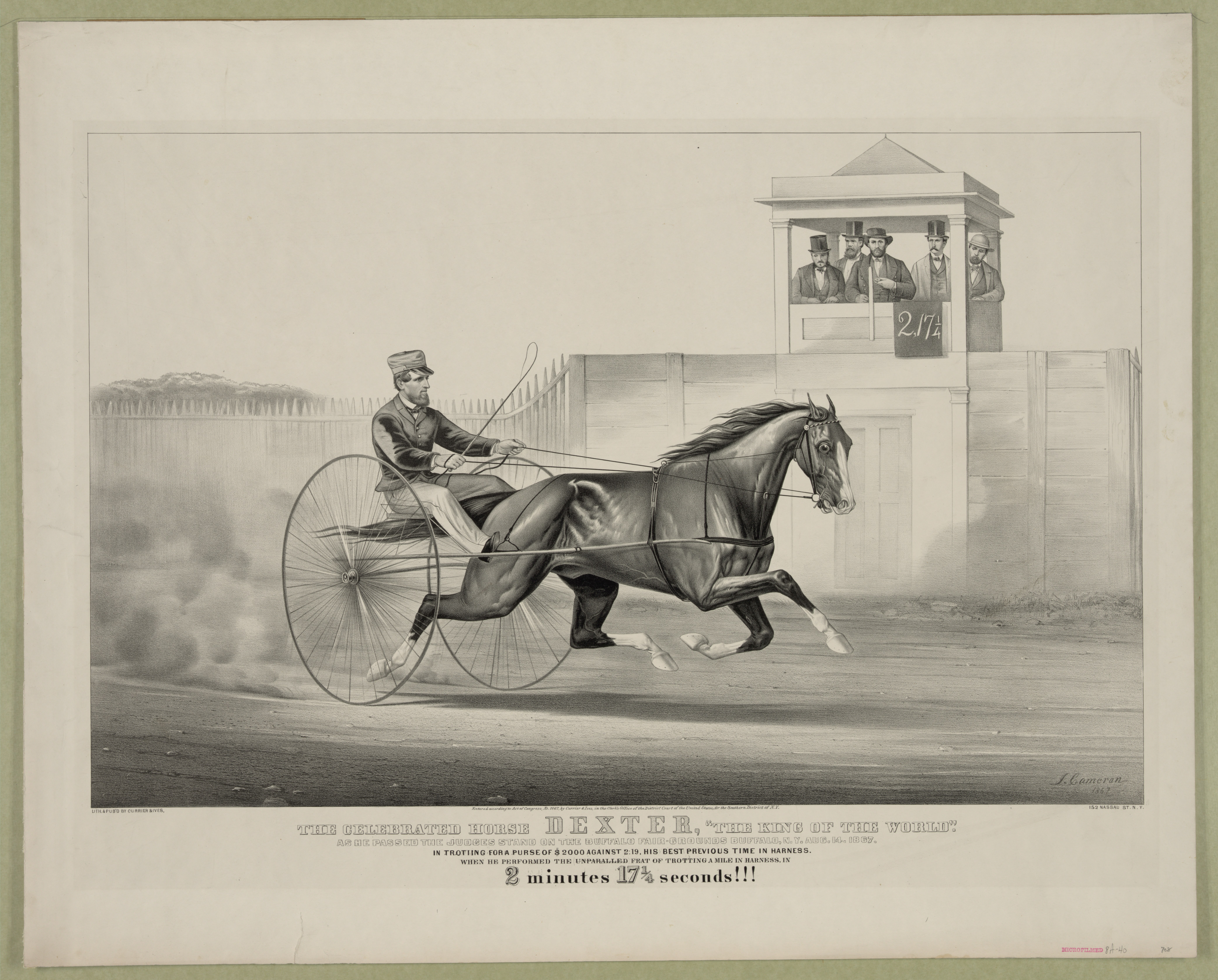
- Breed: Standardbred
- Sire: Hambletonian 10
- Grandsire: Abdallah
- Dam: Clara
- Damsire: American Star
- Sex: Gelding
- Foaled: May 5, 1858
- Died: April 21, 1888 (aged 30)
- Country: United States
- Colour: Brown
- Breeder: Jonathan Hawkins & Jonas Hawkins
- Owner: Robert E. Bonner
- Record: 2:17 1/4

Honours
- Harness Racing Hall of Fame Immortal (1956)

Dexter (1857 – 1888) was an American trotting horse who was inducted into the Immortals category of the Harness Racing Hall of Fame.

== Origin and early years ==
Dexter was bred by Jonathan Hawkins of Walden in Orange County, New York. He was sired by Hambletonian 10, a great-grandson of the Thoroughbred sire, Messenger. Dexter was foaled on May 5, 1858. His dam was known as Clara, daughter of Jonas Seeley's American Star and a sister to Shark. Dexter was Clara's first foal. For four years, Dexter ran unbroken on the homestead of the Hawkins family until 1862. Jonathan, in conjunction with his father, Jonas Hawkins, bred and owned the horse. It was once rumored that Dexter was sired by Harry Clay based on his markings similar to Clay Trotting Horses. Dexter was a rich brown gelding with a blaze and four white legs.

At age four, Dexter was sold for $400 to George Hubbard Alley in June 1862 and sent to New Rochelle to be broken as a roadster. Dexter, as a colt, was difficult to manage. After a failed attempt, Alley then sent him to colt-handler John Mingo in Flushing, Queens, for two months of professional handling.

== Racing career ==
At five, Dexter was placed under Hiram Woodruff's guidance in 1863. With little training, Dexter trotted a 2:42 in his first mile heat, then improved to 2:31¼ a month later. By 1864, his turf debut catapulted him to national recognition.

On October 10, 1865, Dexter set a saddle record of 2:18¼ in a trotting race at Long Island's Fashion Course.

In 1866, Dexter, now eight years old, changed hands when George Trussel bought him for $14,000. He opened his 1866 campaign with a 2:24½ win over General Butler, then bested Stonewall Jackson in three-mile saddle heats. He became known as "The King of the Turf."

Dexter lowered his time to 2:18 under saddle at the Fashion Course on August 18, 1866, and recorded a harness record of 2:19 at Riverside Park's half-mile track in Boston on July 30, 1867.

Soon after, he was assigned to trainer Budd Doble. During the following season, Dexter made history in Buffalo, New York, on August 14, 1867, posting a record time of 2:17¼ with Budd Doble at the reins. The trotting horse outpaced the 2:19 record held by Flora Temple.

That month, Dexter was promptly purchased by newspaper publisher Robert E. Bonner for $35,000 and went on to serve as his prized roadhorse. Dexter's racing career ended after Bonner acquired him, since Bonner did not believe in racing his own horses.

== Death ==
Dexter died in 1888, at age 30.

== Legacy ==
Dexter was the first standout trotter from the Hambletonian line.

The world record-setting horse became the namesake of the Dexter Park Hotel in Queens and Dexter Park in Chicago.

His reputation as a racehorse was such that Robert E. Bonner, his owner, permitted Ulysses S. Grant to ride him publicly during Grant's post-Civil War presidential campaign. In 1868, the famous trotter inspired the name of Dexter, Iowa.

Dexter was inducted into the Harness Racing Hall of Fame as an "Immortal" in 1956.

== Gallery ==
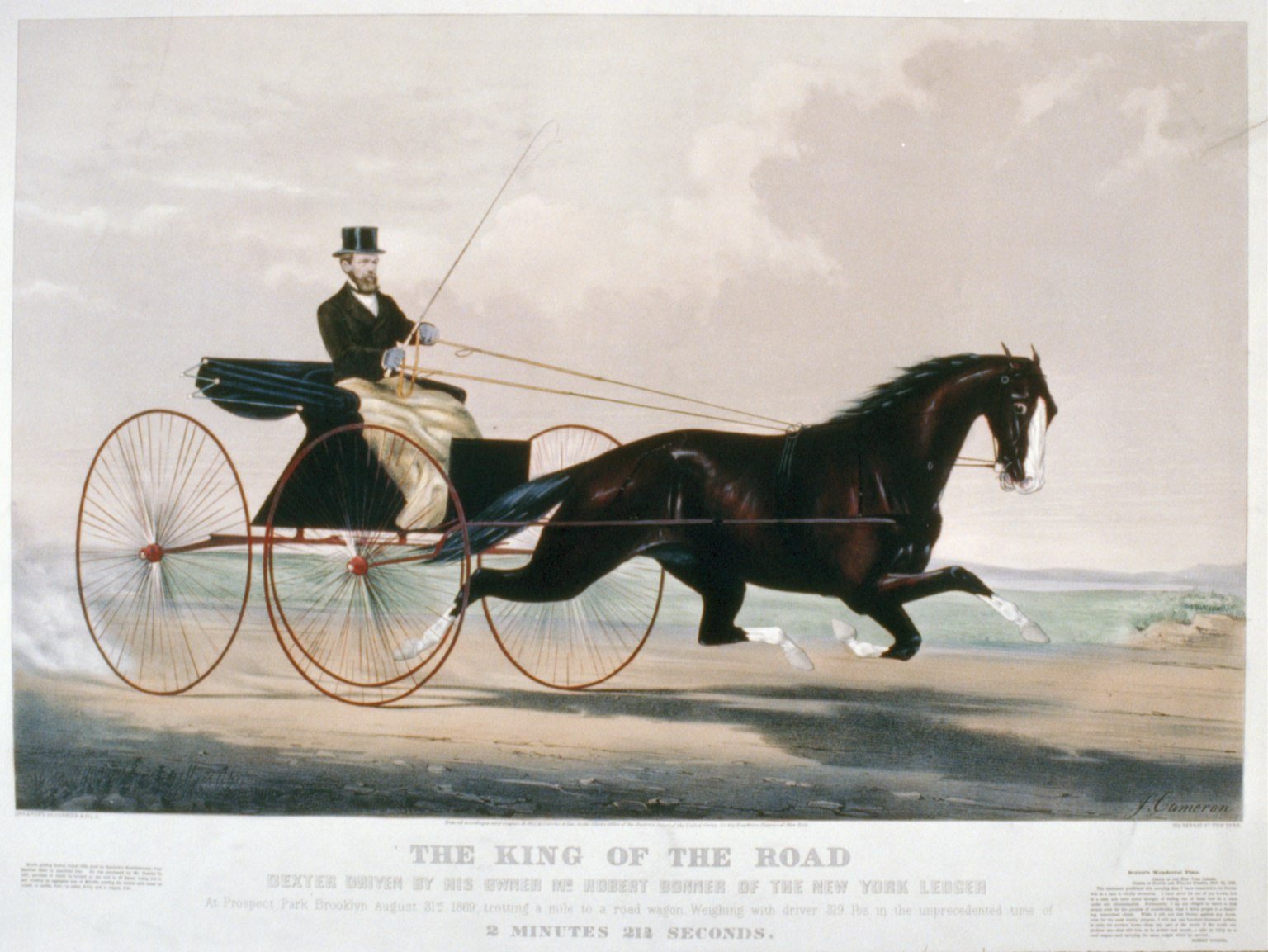
Dexter driven by his owner, Mr. Robert Bonner of the New York Ledger, at Prospect Park, Brooklyn, August 31, 1869

== See also ==
- List of racehorses
