= Hiram Woodruff =

American harness racing driver and horse trainer (1817–1867)

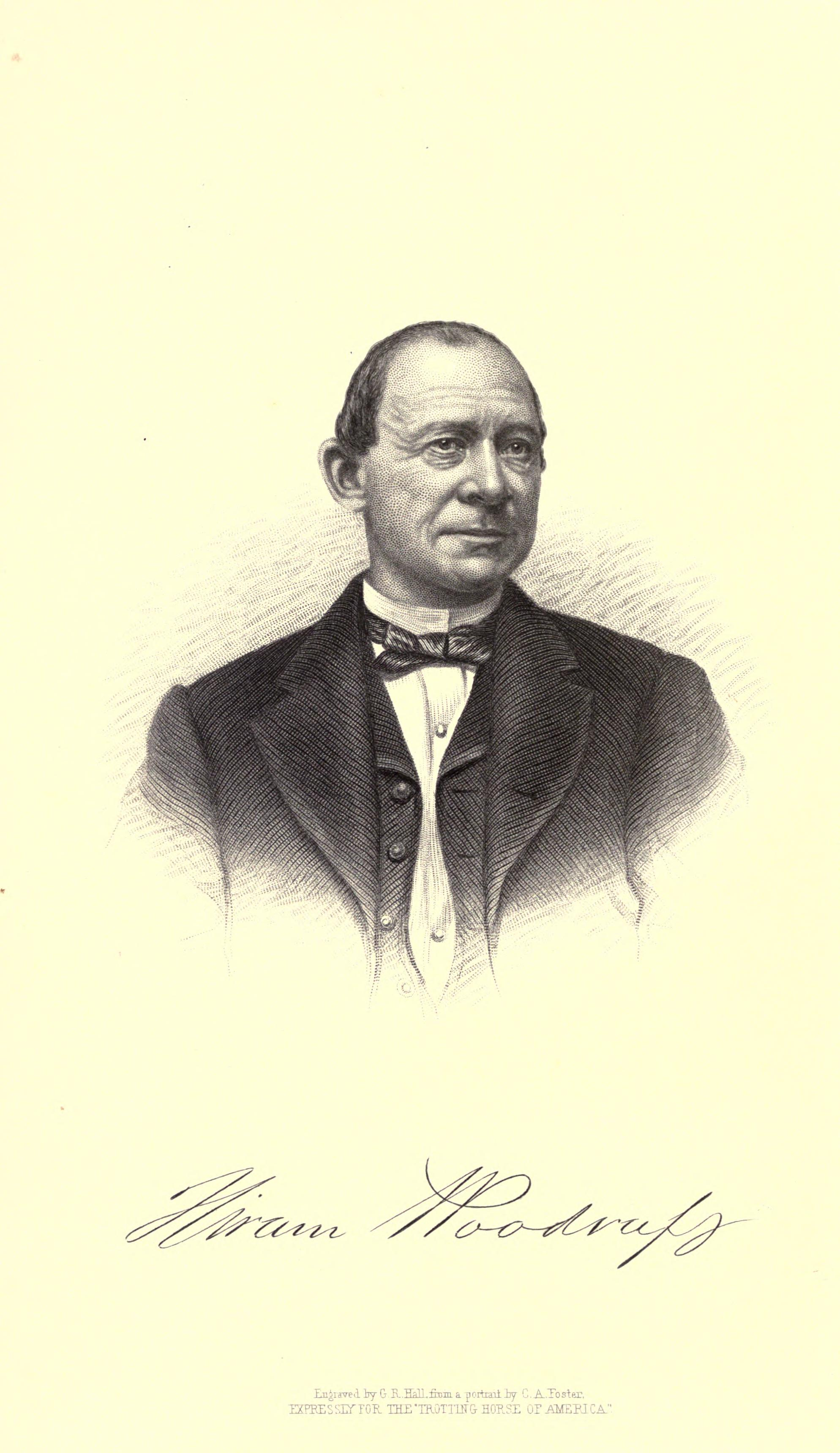

Personal information
- Nickname: Uncle Hiram Woodruff
- Born: Hiram Washington Woodruff; February 22, 1817 Flemington, New Jersey, U.S.
- Died: March 15, 1867 (aged 50) Long Island, New York, U.S.
- Resting place: Cypress Hills Cemetery
- Occupations: Harness racing driver; horse trainer
- Parent: John Woodruff (father)

Horse racing career
- Sport: Harness racing

Honors
- United States Harness Racing Hall of Fame (1958)

Significant horses
- Topgallant; Dutchman; Kemble Jackson; Flora Temple; Dexter

Hiram Woodruff (February 22, 1817 – March 15, 1867) was an American harness racing jockey and horse trainer. He was inducted into the United States Harness Racing Hall of Fame in 1958.

== Early life ==
Hiram Washington Woodruff was born on February 22, 1817, in Flemington, New Jersey, United States.

As a child, he moved to Philadelphia with his family.

His earliest horse‑training knowledge came from his father John and his uncle George Woodruff, who were both well-known drivers and trainers of trotting horses. Hiram received his first regular lessons in horsemanship from his uncle. Even as horse racing became his livelihood, Woodruff regarded horses as more than tools for betting.

== Career ==
He first took up jockeying in Philadelphia and Baltimore. He made his harness racing debut at Hunting Park Course.

At age thirteen in 1831, he guided Topgallant, sired by Coriander, a son of Messenger, to a string of wins. When he was fourteen, he won long‑distance saddle events, including an eighteen‑mile ride in one hour on Shaking Quaker. Showing great promise in the race, he was chosen to ride Lady Kate, who was set to trot fifteen miles within an hour. He debuted at the Union Course in Woodhaven in 1833 on a horse called Paul Pry.

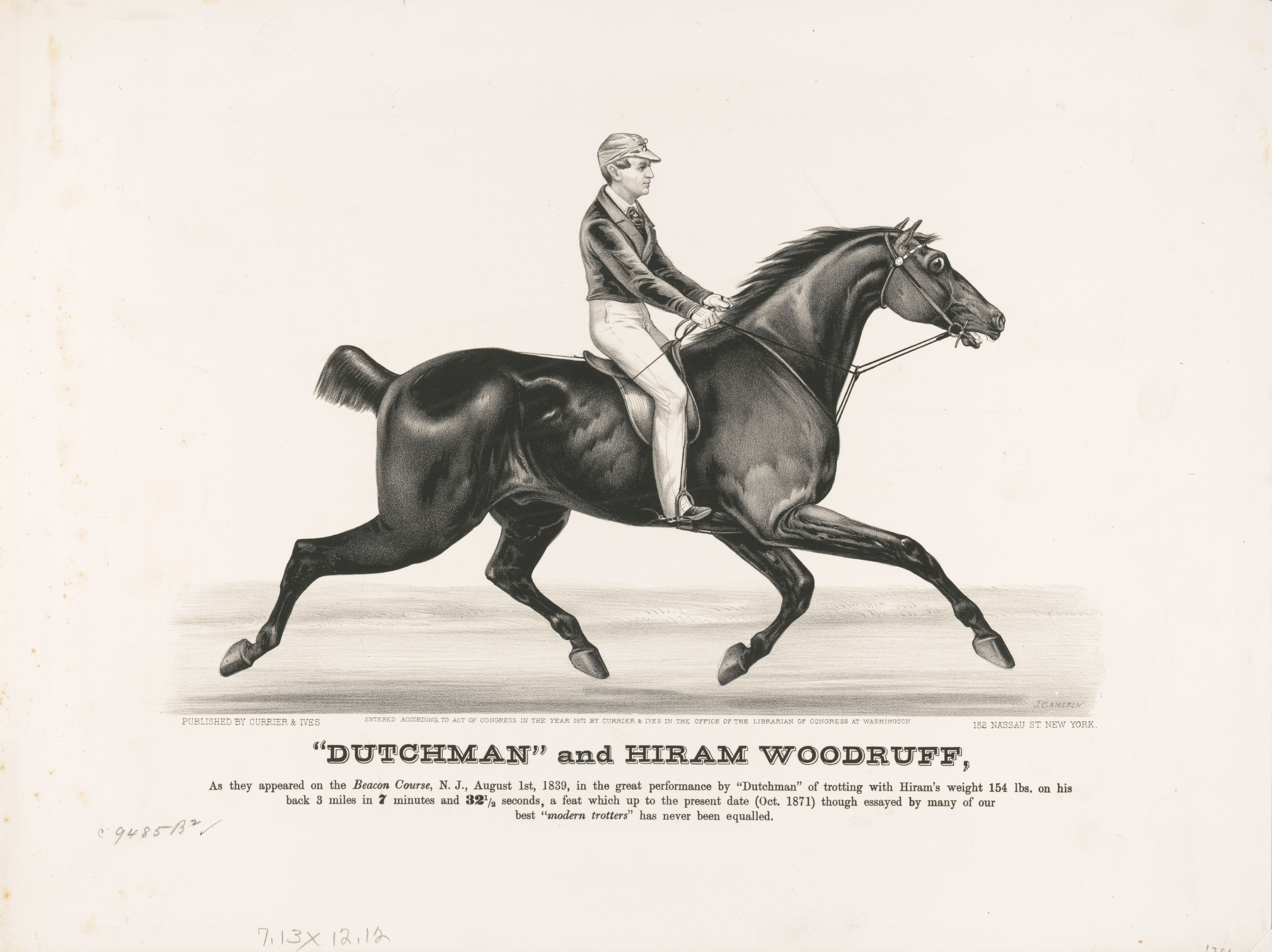
"Dutchman" and Hiram Woodruff by Currier & Ives, 1871

His early string of victories on nearly every mount made him well known, and after moving to New York around 1836, many owners clamored for his riding and training expertise for the racing seasons. Yet his true reputation was cemented in 1839 when he took charge of the famed trotter Dutchman, training him carefully before winning a $1,000, three‑mile heat against the clock in 7 :32 ½. On August 1, 1839, at the Beacon Course in Hoboken, New Jersey, "Dutchman," carrying Hiram's 154 lb, covered three miles in 7:32 ½ —a mark no contemporary trotter had matched by October 1871. Riding the fine trotter Dutchman over long distances brought Woodruff renown when he bested competitors such as Lady Suffolk, Rattler, and Awful. After Dutchman, he trained and drove Ripton, Gray Eagle, Kemble Jackson, Confidence, Lady Suffolk, Flora Temple, Rose of Washington, Boston Girl, Lady Woodruff, and eventually Dexter.

In his late twenties, Woodruff began managing the Harlem Park Course around 1845 for two years. He later became proprietor of Boston's North Cambridge Track from 1847 to 1850. Afterward, he returned to New York to operate the Union Saloon on Broadway with Albert Losee for a short period.

Next to John I. Snedeker's roadhouse, Woodruff built a large hotel and named it the Dexter Park Inn to honor the record-setting trotter he once drove. He operated the old roadhouse and training stables on Jamaica Avenue's north side, opposite Union Course, from 1851 to 1867. On what was then Brooklyn's chief riding road, Hiram Woodruff's was the main attraction. For twenty five years before his death, his stables sheltered all the top trotters brought by horsemen who were preparing themselves and their horses for upcoming races. The roadhouse was both his home and a hub for wealthy owners, painters, and drivers to share drinks and horse talk. Among the frequent guests were Cornelius Vanderbilt, Robert E. Bonner, George Alley, Jim McMann, Peter and Bill Whelan, and Isaac and George Wilkes.

Woodruff's mount in 1853 was the large chestnut horse Kemble Jackson, sired by Andrew Jackson. At the Union Course, he drove for a $4,000 purse and pioneered the "Kemble Jackson check" by using a standing martingale instead of a check rein. In three‑mile heats at 395 lb, Kemble Jackson covered the distance in 8:03 and 8:04¾—edging out O'Blennis in a close contest.

At the Union Course on June 20, 1856, Woodruff piloted Rocket in a high‑stakes $10,000 match race versus Dan Pfifer's Brown Dick.

On September 2, 1856, he drove Flora Temple to victory over Tacony at the Union Course, posting the fastest recorded time of 2:24½. He is thought to be the first on record, in 1857, to race a horse without horse harnesses. During one match, he removed Boston Girl's "Dutch collar" and traces after the first heat and easily won the next two, pulled only by the reins.

In 1863, Woodruff was sent Dexter by George Alley and the horse showed a 2:42 time pulling a wagon with little training before improving to 2:31¼. He first took Dexter to the trotting turf at the Fashion Course in the spring of 1865. Dexter eventually achieved a mile time of 2:18 under Woodruff's direction. First driven by Woodruff, Dexter (2:17½) later came under Budd Doble's reins.

In 1866, Hiram Woodruff guided Robert E. Bonner's gray mare Peerless a quarter mile at a two-minute mile rate, using not a sulky but a heavier, four-wheeled skeleton wagon.

== Personal life ==
Hiram W. Woodruff married Sarah Anne Howe in Jamaica, Queens.

== Death ==
Hiram Washington Woodruff died in Long Island, New York, United States, on March 15, 1867, at age 50.

His funeral on March 17, 1867, was held in deep snow, requiring his remains to be carried by sleigh to Cypress Hills Cemetery in Woodhaven, Queens. He was laid to rest on a hill crest overlooking Union Course. His grave is marked by a large monument inscribed with the following: "To the memory of Hiram Washington Woodruff, born February 22, 1817; died March 15, 1867, aged 50 years. This monument was erected by his friends. He was engaged for a period of forty years in riding, training, and driving the trotting horse of America. He was alike conspicuous for his genius, his unswerving integrity, and his kindness of heart."

== Legacy ==
Woodruff spent forty years driving and training horses, inspecting his era's finest trotters and developing their speed. He lowered the mile trot time from 2:40 to 2:17¼. Throughout his many years in trotting, he maintained a reputation for never selling or throwing a race.

At Queens' Union Course, Woodruff made his mark on turf history. He helped turn Queens into a mecca for the sport of harness racing, boasting world-famous racecourses.

Hiram Woodruff's book, The Trotting Horse of America, was published in 1868. The idea for the work came from newspaper publisher Robert E. Bonner, who highly regarded Woodruff's expertise in trotting horse training and driving. It was edited by Charles J. Foster of Wilkes' Spirit of the Times. Woodruff is regarded as the pioneer of the Standardbred training tradition. George Wilkes said "the development of the American trotter to its present marvelous preeminence over all other breeds of horses used for harness and road purposes is more due to Hiram Woodruff than to any if not than to all other men who ever lived."

French animalier Henri Delattre painted an oil painting of Hiram and one of his horses, titled "Flying Dutchman Ridden By Hiram Woodruff."

In 1958, he was inducted into the United States Harness Racing Hall of Fame.
