= List of Philadelphia Giants seasons =

This list of Philadelphia Giants seasons compiles games played by the Philadelphia Giants. Seasons in which the Giants were league members (or an associate team), only games that counted in official league standings are included. Seasons in which they had no league membership and played an independent/barnstorming schedule include games against primarily major-league-caliber teams.

Contemporary coverage of games and won-loss standings was spotty and inconsistent. On-going research continuously discovers unreported or misreported games, while some games are probably lost forever. Therefore, Negro league seasonal finishes will likely remain incomplete and subjective.

== Year by year ==
Colored World Series Champions (1924–1927 & 1942–1948) *	League champions ‡	Other playoff ^

Season	Level	League	Season finish		Games	Wins	Loses	Ties	Win% (Note: Placement in annual standings were generally decided by win percentage; "games behind" were never used.)	Postseason	Ref
Season	Level	League	Full (Note: Finish in years when only a full season was indicates actual place in standings. Finish in years a split season was played indicates combined place in standings for both halves of the season.)	Split (Note: Years with a "—" did not play a split season. "1st" or 2nd" indicate which half of the season was won. "DNQ" indicates team did not win either half and did not qualify for postseason.)	Games	Wins	Loses	Ties	Win%	Postseason	Ref
Philadelphia Giants
1902	Independent	—	—	—							
1903^	Independent	—	—	—						Lost challenge to East-region championship (Cuban X-Giants) 5–2	
1904^	Independent	—	—	—	13	10	3	0	.769	Won challenge to East-region championship (Cuban X-Giants) 2–1	
1905^	Independent	—	—	—	13	12	0	1	1.000	Won challenge to East-region championship (Brooklyn Royal Giants) 3–0	
1906‡	Independent	—	—	—	42	25	13	4	.658	Won challenge to East-region championship (Cuban X-Giants) 5–0	
1906‡	Minor	IL	1	—	8	7	1	0	.875	Won IL title outright	
1907‡	Independent	—	—	—							
1907‡	Minor	NA	1	—	21	13	8	0	.619	Won NA title outright	
1908^	Independent	—	—	—						Tied challenge with West-region claimed-champion (Chicago Leland Giants) 3–3; Claimed East-region championship	
1908^	Minor	NA	2	—	31	16	15	0	.516		
1909^	Independent	—	—	—						Won challenge with West-region claimed-champion (Chicago Leland Giants) 3–1; Claimed East-region championship	
1909^	Minor	NA	3	—	18	6	12	0	.333		
1910	Independent	—	—	—	21	7	14	0	.333		
1911	Independent	—	—	—	22	6	16	0	.273		

Key
