= Flora Temple =

American-bred Standardbred racehorse

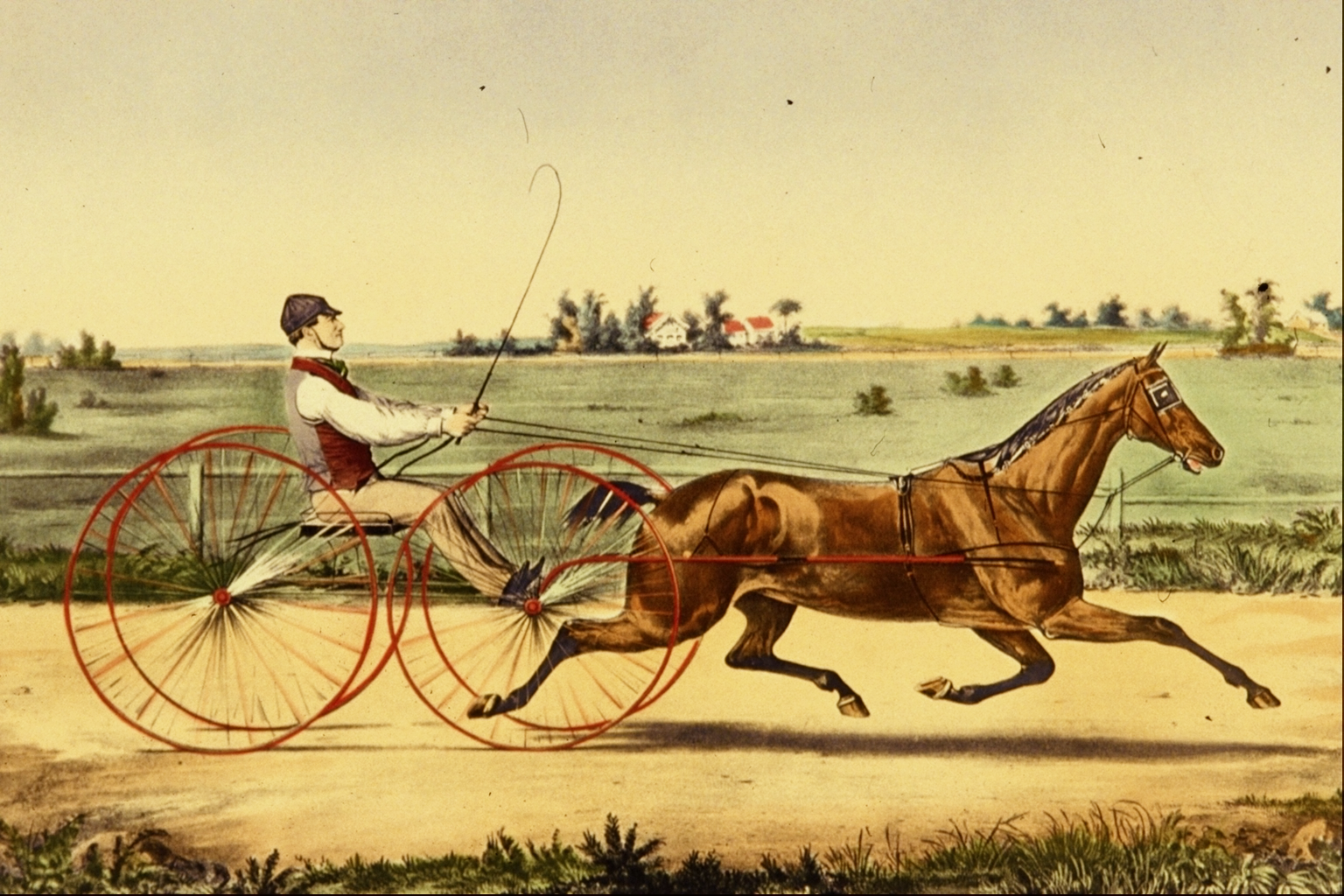
- Flora Temple by Currier & Ives
- Sire: Bogus Hunter
- Dam: Madam Temple
- Damsire: Spotted Arabian Horse
- Sex: Mare
- Foaled: May 1845
- Died: December 21, 1877 (aged 33)
- Country: United States
- Colour: Bay
- Breeder: Samuel Welch
- Record: 2:19¾

Honours
- Harness Racing Hall of Fame Immortal (1955)

Flora Temple (1845–1877) was an American trotting horse who was inducted into the Immortals category of the Harness Racing Hall of Fame.

== Origin and early years ==
Flora was bred by Samuel Welch of Oneida County, New York. Flora was foaled in May 1845. According to Samuel Welch, her sire was Bogus Hunter, owned by Washington Loomis. Earlier reports named One-Eyed Hunter, son of Kentucky Hunter, as Flora's sire. Her dam was known as Madam Temple, a spotted Arabian horse. Inheriting her dam's color, form, and size, she was sold along with her dam to Archie Hughes of Sangerfield by S. Welch in the summer of 1845.

Flora was later purchased by Jonathan Vielee for $175 and, after showing speed in a four-wheel wagon, was sold to George E. Perrin for $350 in 1850. She then passed to Perrin's brother John, who sold her to her first real trainer, Hiram Woodruff.

== Racing career ==
Flora won a small purse with a time of 2:49 at Long Island's Course on September 9, 1850. She missed the 1851 season due to injury but returned to win two races in 1852. By 1852, she started racing under the name Flora Temple.

She opened her 1853 season in Philadelphia on April 27, racing through the summer and defeating Highland Maid, Tacony, Lady Vernon, and Rhode Island. Flora Temple suffered her first defeat in 1853 to Black Douglas, a son of Henry Clay, but defeated him with ease just months later.

After being purchased by James D. McMann in November 1854, Flora Temple made her debut under his ownership in a race against Sontag.

Flora Temple dominated mid-19th-century racing with a series of record-breaking performances. She defeated Ethan Allen in 1856. Driven by Hiram Woodruff, she first made history at the Union Course on September 2, 1856, with a record time of 2:24½. She broke the trotting record previously held by Highland Maid.

Ownership of Flora Temple changed hands in 1858 when William McDonald of Baltimore bought her for $8,000. That year, she defeated Prince and Reindeer and faced Princess in a series of races in 1859, after the mare was brought from California.

Her 7:54 three-mile to wagon at the Centreville Course on June 17, 1859, was the third fastest of the period next to Prince (7:53½) and Lancet (7:53¾). Throughout 1859, she lowered the one-mile trotting record on four occasions with James D. McMann at the reins. On August 9, 1859, she ran one mile in 2:21½ and 2:21¼ at the Centreville Course. She also set a two-mile harness record of 4:50½ over the Centreville Course on August 15, 1859. She improved the one-mile record to 2:20½ on October 8 in Cincinnati and 2:19¾ on October 15, 1859, in Kalamazoo.

In 1860, she faced George M. Patchen in a series of races and defeated John Morgan the following year.

Her three-mile harness record of 7:23¾, set on September 27, 1860, stood for 12 years.

After a race between Ethan Allen, in which Flora had lost three straight heats, the trotting mare was seized from the horse racing track. Under the Confiscation Act of 1861, deputy marshals seized the property of her owner who was a Baltimore Secessionist. William McDonald of the Confederate States Army, had engaged in raising an armed regiment in anticipation of Maryland being forced from the Union. At the outbreak of the American Civil War, Flora Temple was not in good form and was retired.

When the world-renowned trotting mare had raced her last race in 1861, she had appeared in 112 events and won 95 of them. Her trotting record was later beat by Dexter in 1867.

== Breeding ==
Flora Temple was brought to the breeding farm of Aristides Welch, near Philadelphia, in 1864.

She produced three foals. An effort was made in 1867 to breed Flora Temple to Rysdyk, the son of Hambletonian 10 and Lady Duke by Lexington. Her first foal in 1868 was a bay filly named Kitty Temple.

Flora Temple's second foal, born in June 1869, was Prince Imperial, a bay colt sired by William Welch (son of Hambletonian 10). Though bred for speed, he was eventually sold to newspaper publisher Robert E. Bonner for use as a roadhorse.

In 1871, Flora Temple produced her third foal, The Queen's Daughter, a bay filly sired by the imported Thoroughbred Leamington.

== Death ==
Flora Temple died in Philadelphia, Pennsylvania, United States, on December 21, 1877.

She spent her final days at Aristides Welch's Erdenheim Stud Farm, where she passed in her thirty-third year. She was buried with Leamington.

== Legacy ==
Flora Temple made history as the first trotter to go under 2:20 and gained the title "The Queen of the Turf." She raced to wagon in record time of 2:19¾ at Kalamazoo, Michigan, at the age of fourteen. At the time, her fame led to widespread cultural influence—bonnets, cigars, and whiskey were all named after Flora Temple. Throughout the 1850s, she appeared in various lithographs by Currier & Ives of New York. In 1868, Edward Troye, a painter of early American race horses, produced a work titled "Flora Temple" and her foal, "Kitty Temple."

In Stephen Foster's Camptown Races, the "bob-tail nag" is said to represent Flora Temple.

Flora Temple was inducted into the Harness Racing Hall of Fame as an "Immortal" in 1955.

== Gallery ==
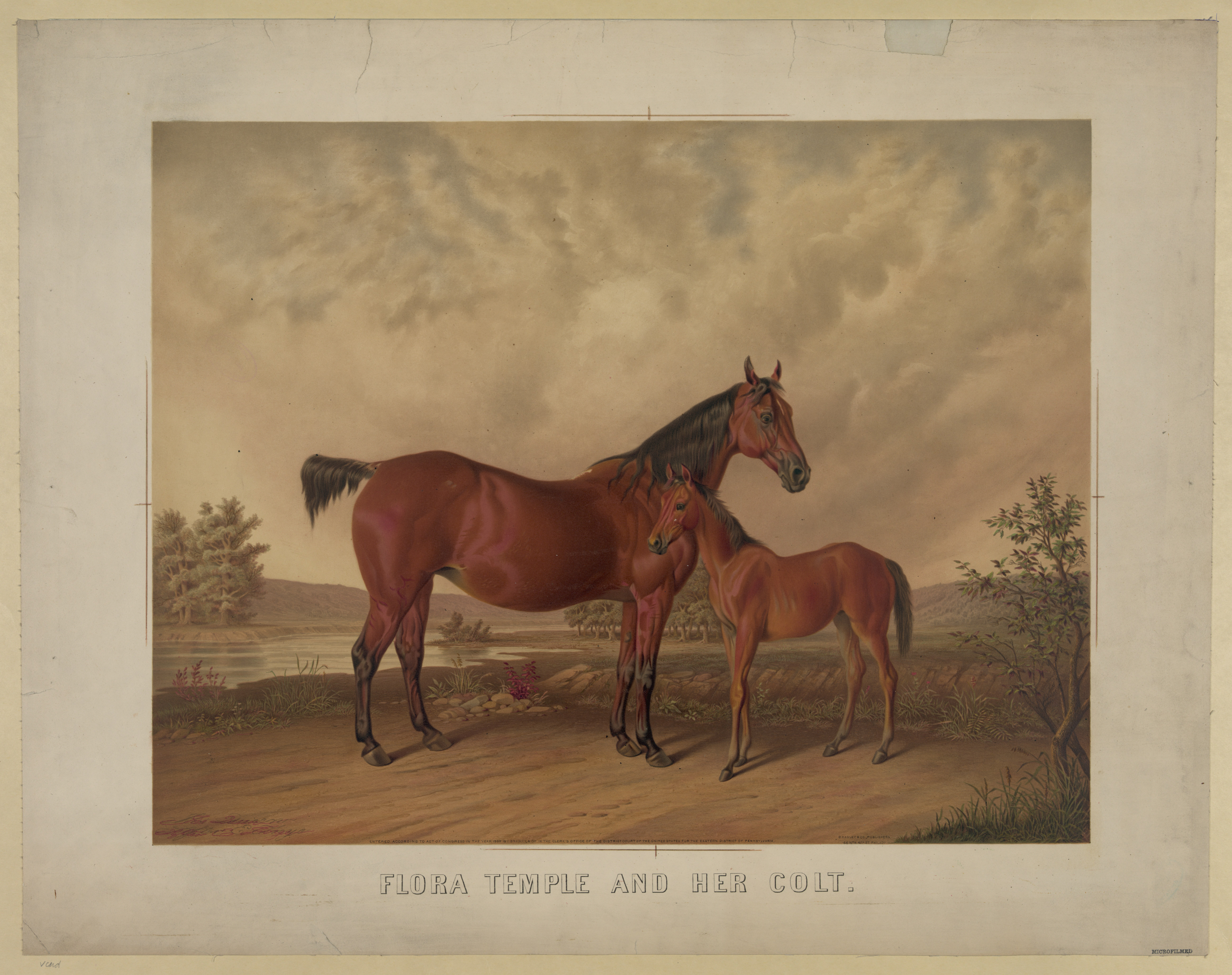
Flora Temple and her foal, Kitty Temple, in "Every Horse Owner's Cyclopedia"

== See also ==
- List of racehorses
