= Maud S. =

Maud S. (March 28, 1874 – March 17, 1900) was an American racehorse prominent in harness racing. Over a six-year period she lowered the world record for a one-mile race seven times.

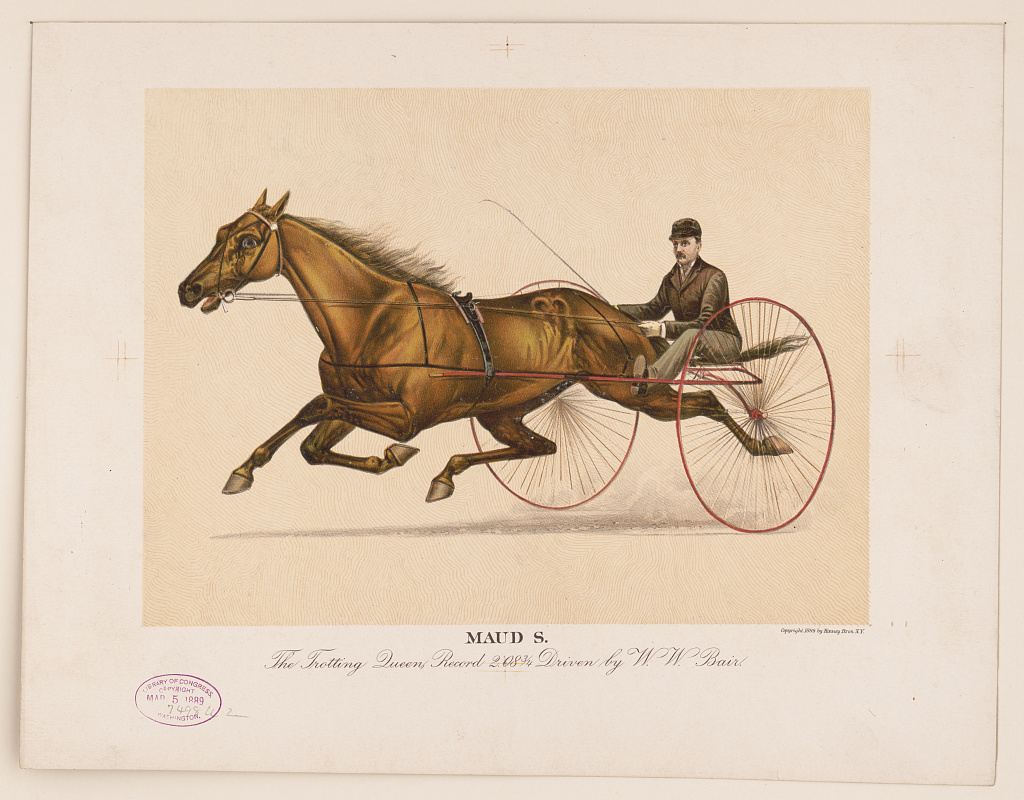
"Maud S., The Trotting Queen" (1889)

== Early years ==
Maud S., a light-red chestnut mare, was the offspring of "Harold" (a son of Hambletonian 10) and "Miss Russell". She was born at the Woodburn Stud in Woodford County, Kentucky, well known for producing harness racing champions. As a yearling she was sold to James Burgher of Ohio for $250, who named her "Sadie Burgher". In 1877, still not fully trained, she was sold for $350 to Cincinnati businessman George Stone, who renamed her "Maud S." after his daughter.

Stone claimed that he suggested that trainer W. W. Bair run Maud S. through the rye next to the track to improve her gait, and that this helped the horse find its trot. In its first race, at the Carthage Fair just outside of Cincinnati, Maud S. stopped and tried to go back into the stable before restarting and winning the race.

== Career ==
"The celebrated trotting mares Maud S. and Aldine, as they appeared June 15th 1883- At the gentlemen's driving park, Morrisania, N.Y. driven by their owner, William H. Vanderbilt, Esq."

In the autumn of 1878 a man named Joseph Harker purchased an option to buy Maud S. for $20,000 if the horse managed a 2:20 mile as a four-year-old. Stone offered Bair, her trainer, $1,000 if she trotted the mile in 2:19. Maud S. trotted a time of 2:17 1/2 in Lexington, Kentucky, on October 26, 1878, a time which was widely reported and considered to be the fastest ever by a four-year-old. After obtaining the option from Harker, William Henry Vanderbilt purchased the horse at the increased price of $21,000. After a time Stone and Bair were allowed to continue managing and training Maud S.; Bair was also the driver.

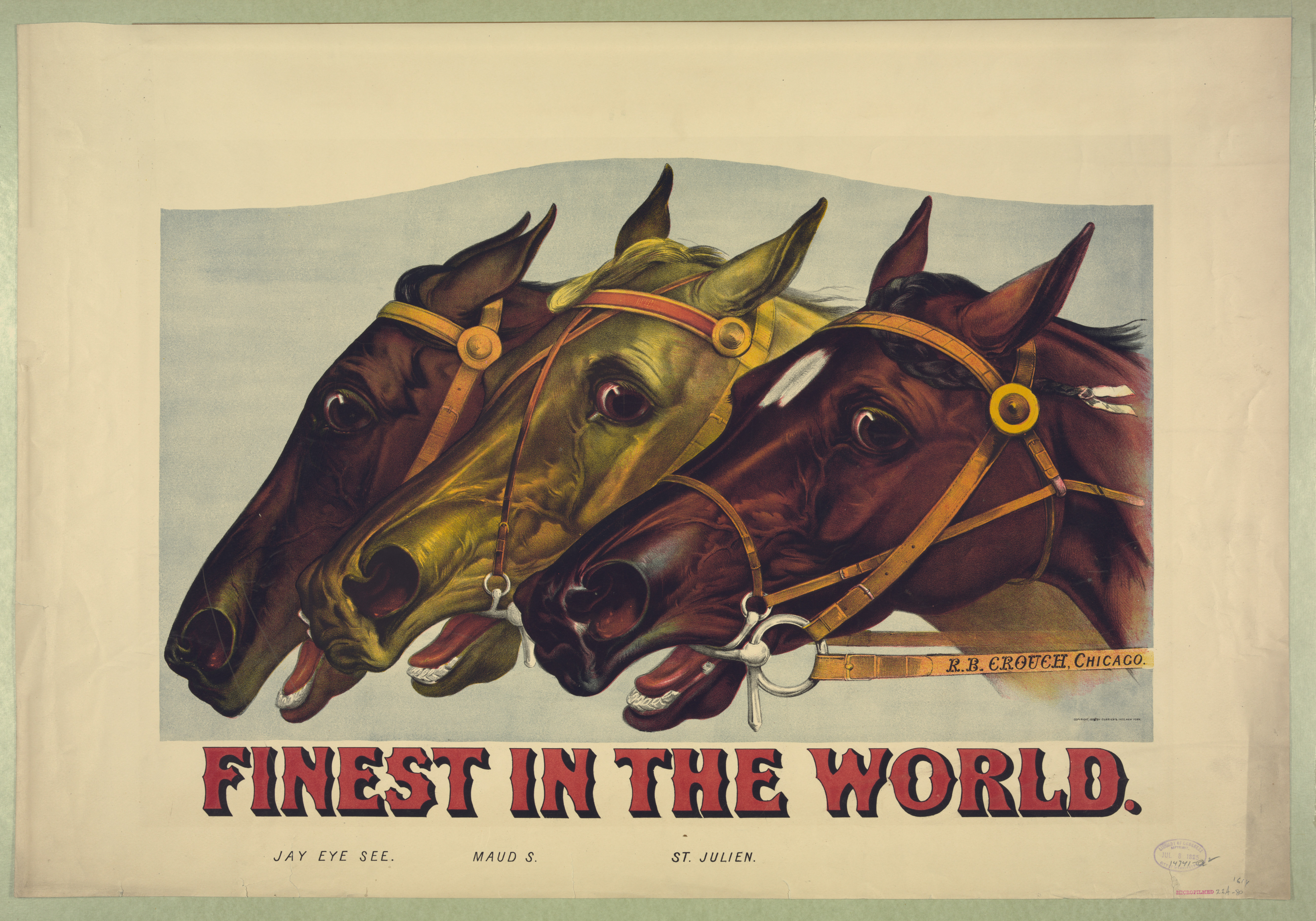
"Finest in the world" - an 1885 engraving showing Jay Eye See, Maud S., and St. Julien

Maud S. first set the world record in 1880 at Rochester, New York, at 2:11 3/4; they shared the record with "St. Julien". In 1881 Maud S. lowered the record for the third time, to 2:10 1/4. In 1884 Jay Eye See set a new record of 2:10 on August 1 in Providence, Rhode Island; on August 2 Maud S. reclaimed the record with a time of 2:09 1/4 in Lexington.

Maud S. was sold in 1884 to newspaper publisher Robert E. Bonner, a rival of the Vanderbilts in the racing world. One theory was that Maud S. was so famous that her owner was jealous of the attention she got when he took her out. Maud S. set one last world record in 1885, 2:08 3/4 in Cleveland, Ohio, before being retired in that year.

Maud S.'s reputation continued well after her retirement; she was exhibited at Madison Square Garden in February 1900 shortly before her death and received an ovation.

== Legacy ==
Maud S. died at the Shultshurst Farm in Port Chester, New York, and is buried in Tarrytown, New York, next to "Dexter", another notable harness racer.

Maud S. was elected to the Harness Racing Hall of Fame in 1955.

The Maud S Mine near Butte, Montana, may have been named for Maud S., and it gave its name to the Maud S Canyon. The Maud S Windmill & Pump Company of Lansing, Michigan, was named after the horse. The "Horse Collar King" John C. Lighthouse sold a patented Maud S horse collar. Maud S.'s image or name was also used to sell a variety of commercial products, including nails, cigarettes, patent medicine, and flour.

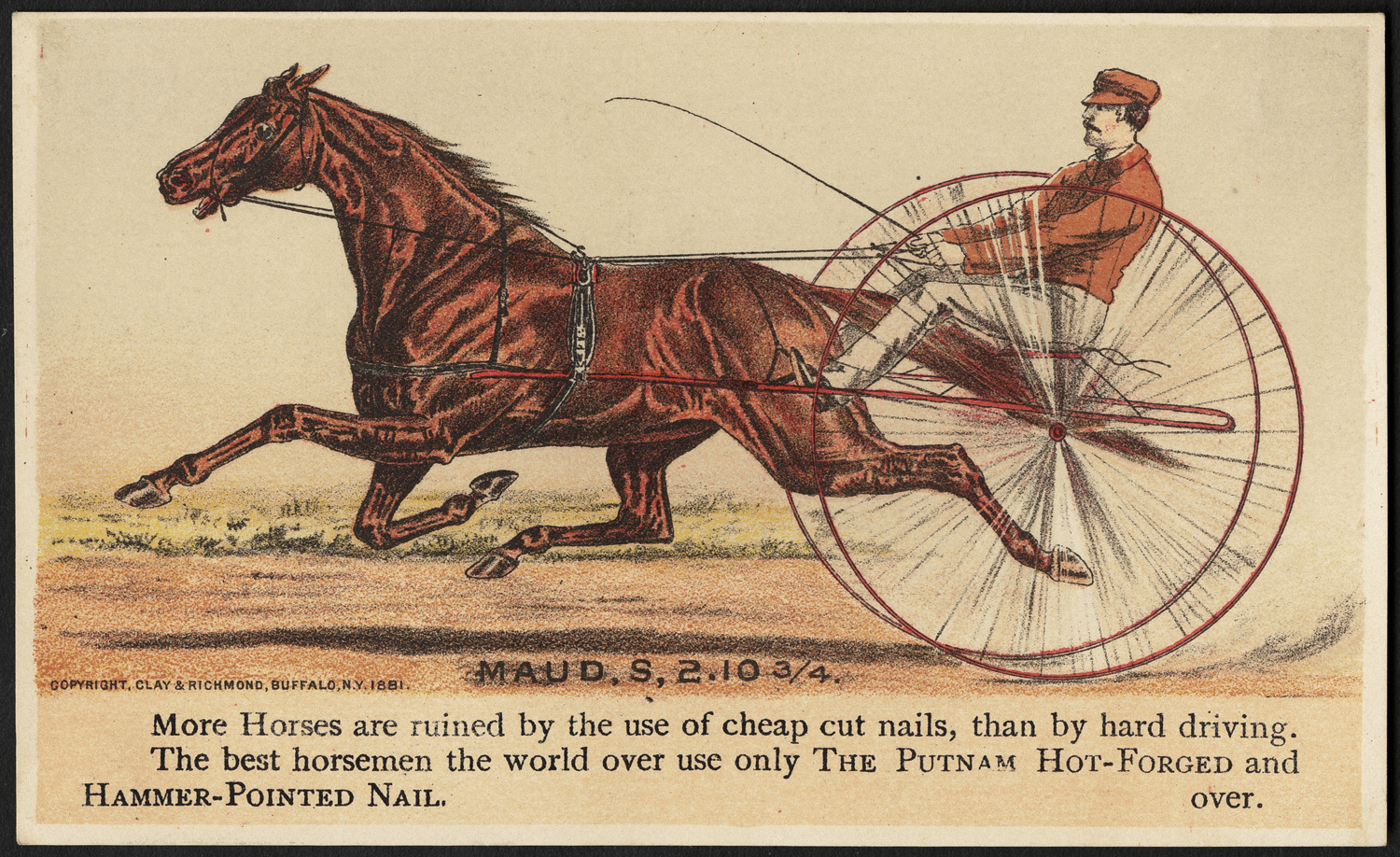
1881 image of Maud S. in an advertisement for nails

Maud S. was stabled at one time near Grand Central Station in New York City; there is a rumor that the mare's ghost appears in the station.
