= Budd Doble =

American harness racing driver (1843–1926)

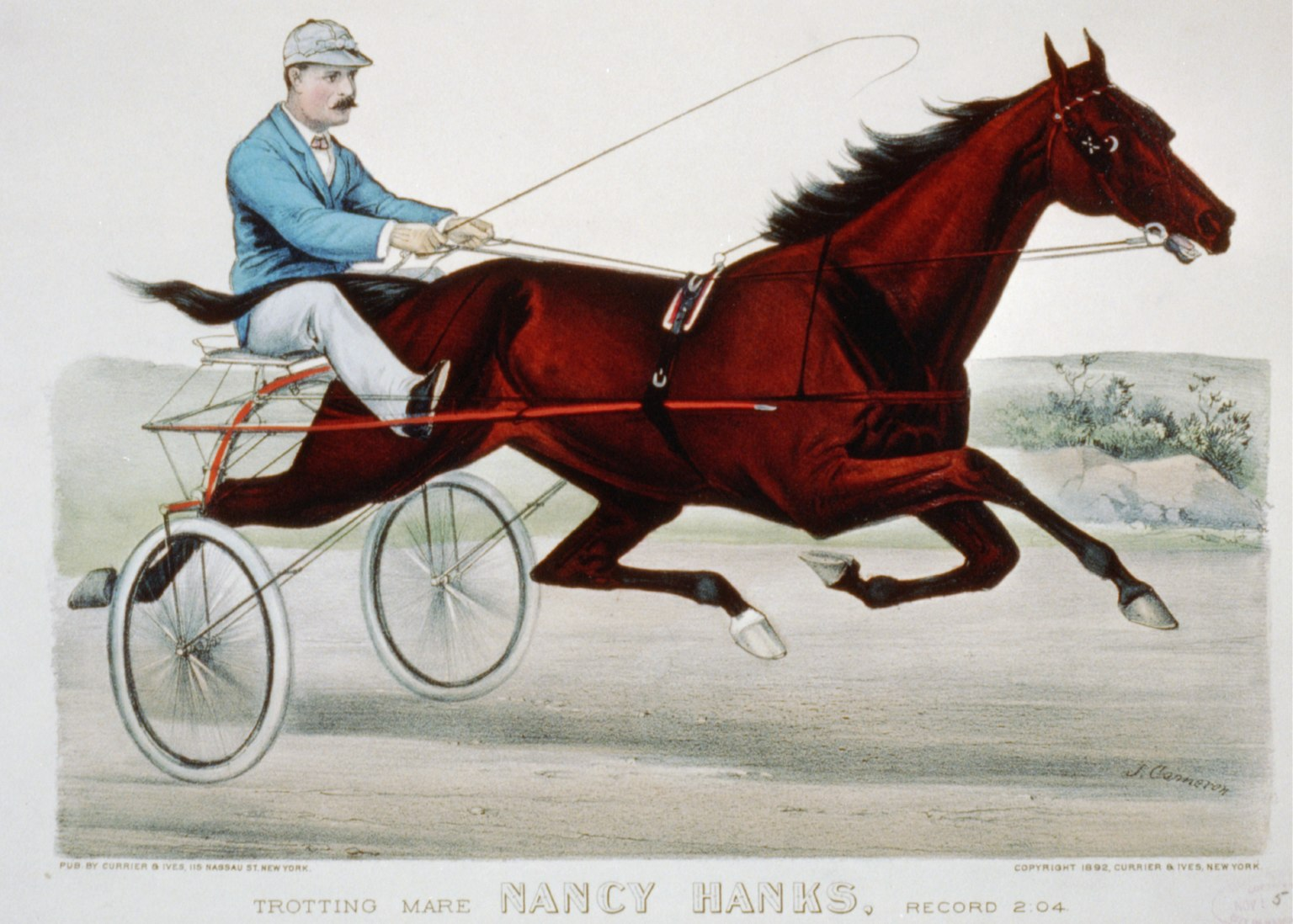
- Budd Doble driving Nancy Hanks, 1892

Personal information
- Born: Budd Doble; May 1843 Philadelphia, Pennsylvania, U.S.
- Died: March 29, 1926 (aged 82) La Puente, California, U.S.
- Occupation: Harness racing driver
- Parent: William H. Doble (father)

Horse racing career
- Sport: Harness racing

Honors
- United States Harness Racing Hall of Fame (1958)

Significant horses
- Dexter; Goldsmith Maid; Nancy Hanks

Budd Doble (May 1843 – March 29, 1926) was an American harness racing jockey and horse trainer who was inducted into the Harness Racing Museum & Hall of Fame in 1958.

== Early life ==
Budd Doble was born in May 1843 in Philadelphia, Pennsylvania, United States.

His father was William H. Doble, and his siblings included William Jr., Frank, and Charles. Coming from a family involved in trotting, Budd was around horses from childhood, with his father working as a horse trainer and driver.

== Career ==
=== Dexter ===
Doble succeeded Hiram Woodruff as the driver of Dexter. He was entrusted with the horse in July 1866 after George Trussel acquired him for $14,000. He was twenty-three when he began riding Dexter, turning him into a champion under saddle, high-wheel, and wagon. That year, he entered thirty-five races and won thirty-four. At Buffalo, New York on August 14, 1867, Budd Doble drove Dexter to a record time of 2:17¼.

=== Goldsmith Maid ===
After paying $20,000 for Goldsmith Maid in 1868, he soon posted a record time of 2:21½ with her. In her first season under Doble in 1868, the mare achieved a successful campaign, winning eight races. At Buffalo, on August 11, 1871, the reinsman drove Goldsmith Maid in harness. They won mile heats best 3 in 5 in 2:19¾, 2:19¼, and 2:19, defeating Lucy and American Girl.

He drove Jay Gould, a Hambletonian 10 colt, to a new world stallion record of 2:21½ on August 7, 1872. He improved on the prior record of 2:22.

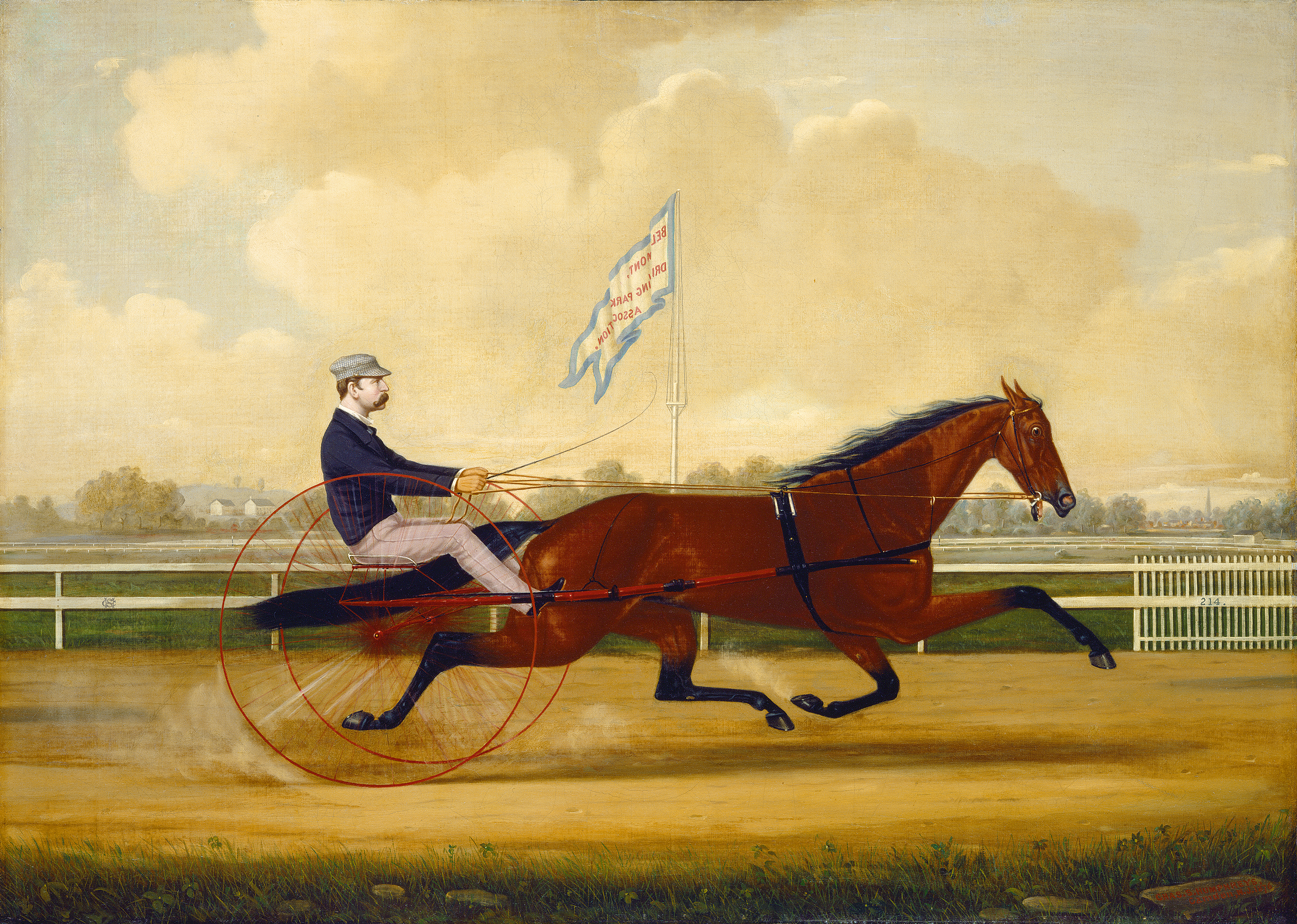
Budd Doble driving Goldsmith Maid at Belmont Driving Park, 1876

In 1874, Doble drove Goldsmith Maid to a series of notable trotting times at major tracks. Budd Doble drove her to a 2:16 mile at East Saginaw, Michigan on July 16, improved to 2:15½ at Buffalo on August 7, and then to 2:14¾ at Rochester on August 12. Their best time came on September 2 at Mystic Park in Boston, where Goldsmith Maid trotted a mile in 2:14. Under his guidance from 1867 to 1877, Goldsmith Maid won 114 races, took 330 heats in 2:30 or faster, and earned more than $250,000.

By 1884, Doble had become a partner in Bohanon & Doble, a carriage-building firm located at 461–463 Wabash Avenue in Chicago.

=== Axtell ===
In Vigo County, Indiana, he set up a stable and breeding farm, bringing with him a team of prominent trainers and veterinarians and drawing many of the country's best horses. Doble stunned the horse world in October 1889 by offering Charles W. Williams $105,000 for his colt Axtell, the highest price ever recorded at the time, on behalf of an Indianapolis syndicate. He took over Axtell's training in 1890. He went further, buying Axtell's full brother for $7,500.

=== Nancy Hanks ===
Shortly after relocating to Terre Haute, Indiana, he was entrusted with the prize mare Nancy Hanks by John Malcolm Forbes. When the bike sulky was introduced in 1892, Doble attached one to Nancy Hanks and led her to lower the world record on three separate occasions that year. He guided her to a 2:07¼ mile at Chicago on August 17 and lowered her time to 2:05¾ at Independence, Iowa, on August 31. On September 28 at Terre Haute, he drove her to a then-record 2:04, ranking her among the fastest trotters of her time. For two years, the record went unbeaten.

In 1893, he entered his bay mare Pixley in the Columbian Exposition Stake of $15,000 at Washington Park Race Track in Chicago. That season, Doble relied on John Dickerson of Terre Haute to drive for him due to a temporary health issue.

After 1895, he left Terre Haute for California. In 1896, he stepped away from racing due to poor health, traveling abroad to recover. He planned to join his wife and daughter in Paris for the 1897 season to focus on his recovery. Highly regarded, he continued working with horses until October 1915, though he rarely ventured past the Rockies. He was hired in 1924 by E. F. Whittier to train trotters for his well-known Hemet stud farm in California.

== Personal life ==
Budd Doble married Clara Baldwin, daughter of Lucky Baldwin, and they had one daughter, Rosebudd Doble. In 1913, Clara and her sister Anita inherited most of their father's estate, receiving approximately $20 million between them.

== Filmography ==
He appeared in Frank Clark's silent film Budd Doble Comes Back in 1913 alongside Bessie Eyton and Wheeler Oakman.

Year	Title	Role	Notes
1913	Budd Doble Comes Back	Himself	

== Death ==
Budd Doble died in La Puente, California, United States, on March 29, 1926, at 85.

== Legacy ==
Budd Doble earned fame by driving Dexter (2:17½), Goldsmith Maid (2:14), and Nancy Hanks (2:04) to record times.

While driving Goldsmith Maid at Belmont Driving Park in 1876, he was painted by Charles S. Humphreys. Thomas Kirby Van Zandt completed an oil painting of Budd Doble driving Abe Edgington in February 1877.

Named for Budd Doble, the one-man light buggy known as “The Budd Doble” speeder was built in 1891 by the Buckeye Buggy Co. of Columbus, Ohio.

In 1900, Doble, near the north shore of Baldwin Lake in San Bernardino, was established and named after Budd Doble, son-in-law of Lucky Baldwin.

Budd Doble was inducted into the United States Harness Racing Hall of Fame in 1958.

== Gallery ==
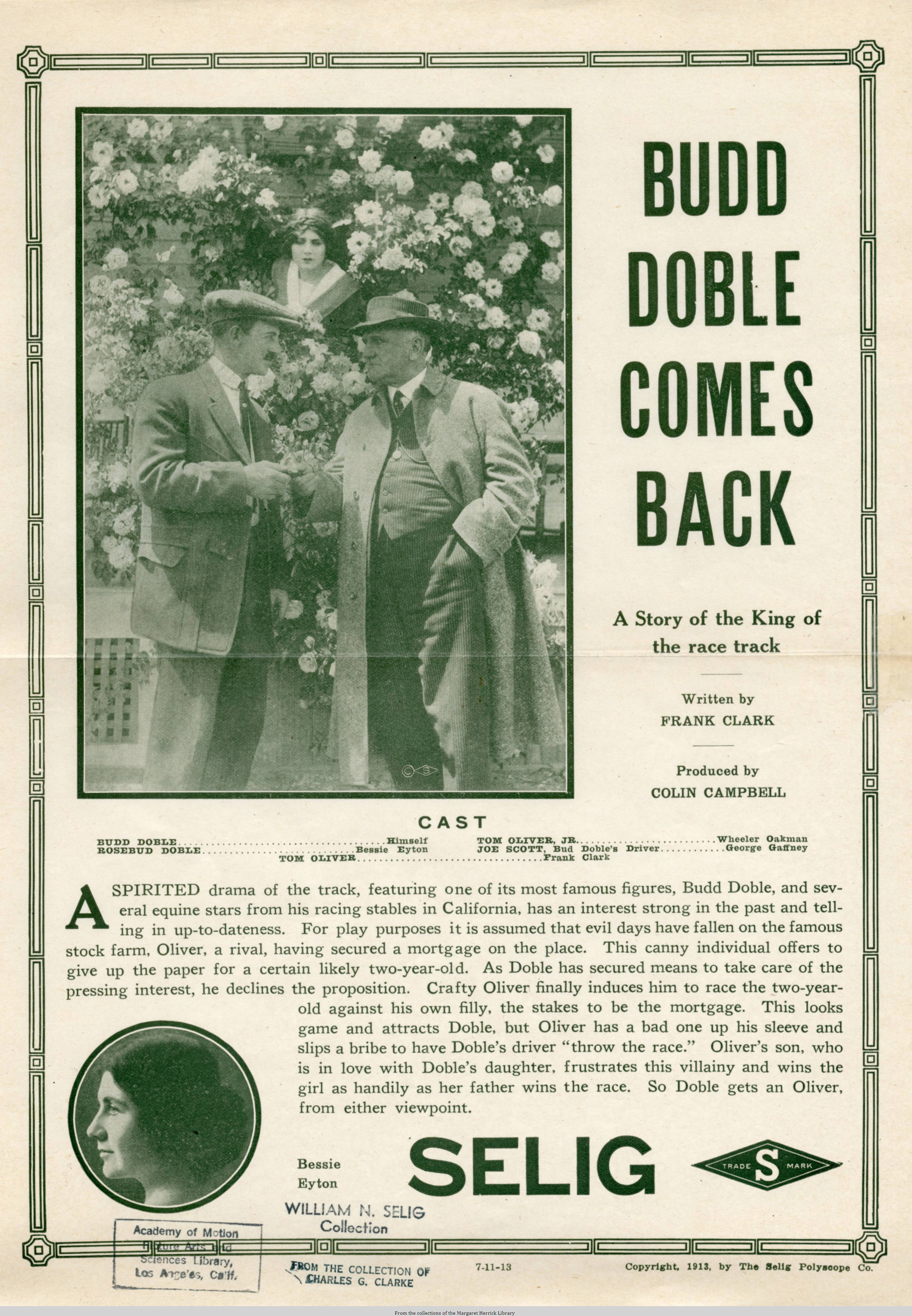
Budd Doble Comes Back, 1913
