= Nat Strong =

American sports executive and Negro league baseball owner and officer

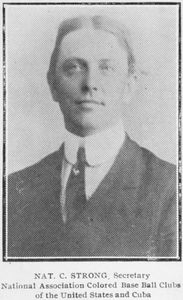
- Born: Nathaniel Calvin Strong; January 4, 1874; Manhattan, New York, U.S.
- Died: January 10, 1935 (aged 61); New Rochelle, New York, U.S.
- Employer: Negro league baseball

Nathaniel Calvin Strong (January 4, 1874 – January 10, 1935) was an American sports executive who was an officer and owner in Negro league baseball.

In 1906 Strong became the Secretary for the National Association of Colored Baseball Clubs of the United States and Cuba, which began play in 1907.

He simultaneously controlled and booked games for many white independent baseball clubs.

He served as a booking agent for East Coast teams, an officer with the New York Black Yankees, part owner of the Cuban Stars (East), and owner of the Brooklyn Royal Giants. Strong also worked for Spalding as a salesman, and owned the New York World Building some time after that paper's closing in 1931.
