= Dexter Park (Queens) =

Former park in Queens, New York

Coordinates: 40°41′37″N 73°52′03″W

Dexter Park was a public park located in the neighborhood of Woodhaven, Queens, New York City, just north of Elderts Lane and Jamaica Avenue, not far from the borough line with Brooklyn. It had a long early history starting in the 19th century as a recreational park, which replaced a racetrack.

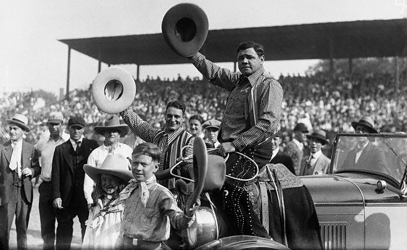
Babe Ruth and Lou Gehrig promote the World Series of Rodeo, 1928

== Horse racing ==
Legend has it that the track was named for a famous horse called Dexter, reputedly buried at the site. However, the Brooklyn Eagle disputed this claim in 1891:

The name of Hiram Woodruff recalls Dexter Park. Hiram was the first owner of that property, and, until five or six years ago, his name still appeared in big letters over the horseshed adjoining the hotel. Then the shed was blown down, and when it was rebuilt the name of Hiram Woodruff had disappeared. But Dexter Park did not take its name from the famous trotter owned by the proprietor of the place. It was known simply as Hiram's, and when Woodruff died a man named Charles Dexter took charge of the place. From that time on it has been known as Dexter Park.'

The lineage progressed from Dexter to Charles Durlier, thence Louis Miller. Under Miller's stewardship the park was devoted to pigeon shooting; while disreputable, it was legal on their side of the Kings County line, as was observed by the South Side Observer in 1885:

Dexter's on the plankroad and just east of the Kings County line is a complete resort for Sunday base ball players. The participants are a class who have been under the eye of the Kings County authorities for some time, but escaped arrest by stepping over into this county. Applause and yelling are the order of the afternoon, and intoxicants are sold.

== Baseball ==
The first regular ballgame was in 1889 when the Brooklyn Elevated Railroad met the Merrits for a Sunday opener that season. The Royal Arcanum League made it their home in the 1890s. In 1901, ownership passed to the William Ulmer Brewery which installed Conrad Hasenflug as manager. This period saw the famous black baseball Brooklyn Royal Giants featured prominently from 1905 to 1913. As Sunday Blue Laws were less strictly enforced in Queens, the destination was quite popular, with the elevated station at 75th Street (now a stop on the New York City Subway's J and Z trains) crowded to and from Brooklyn.

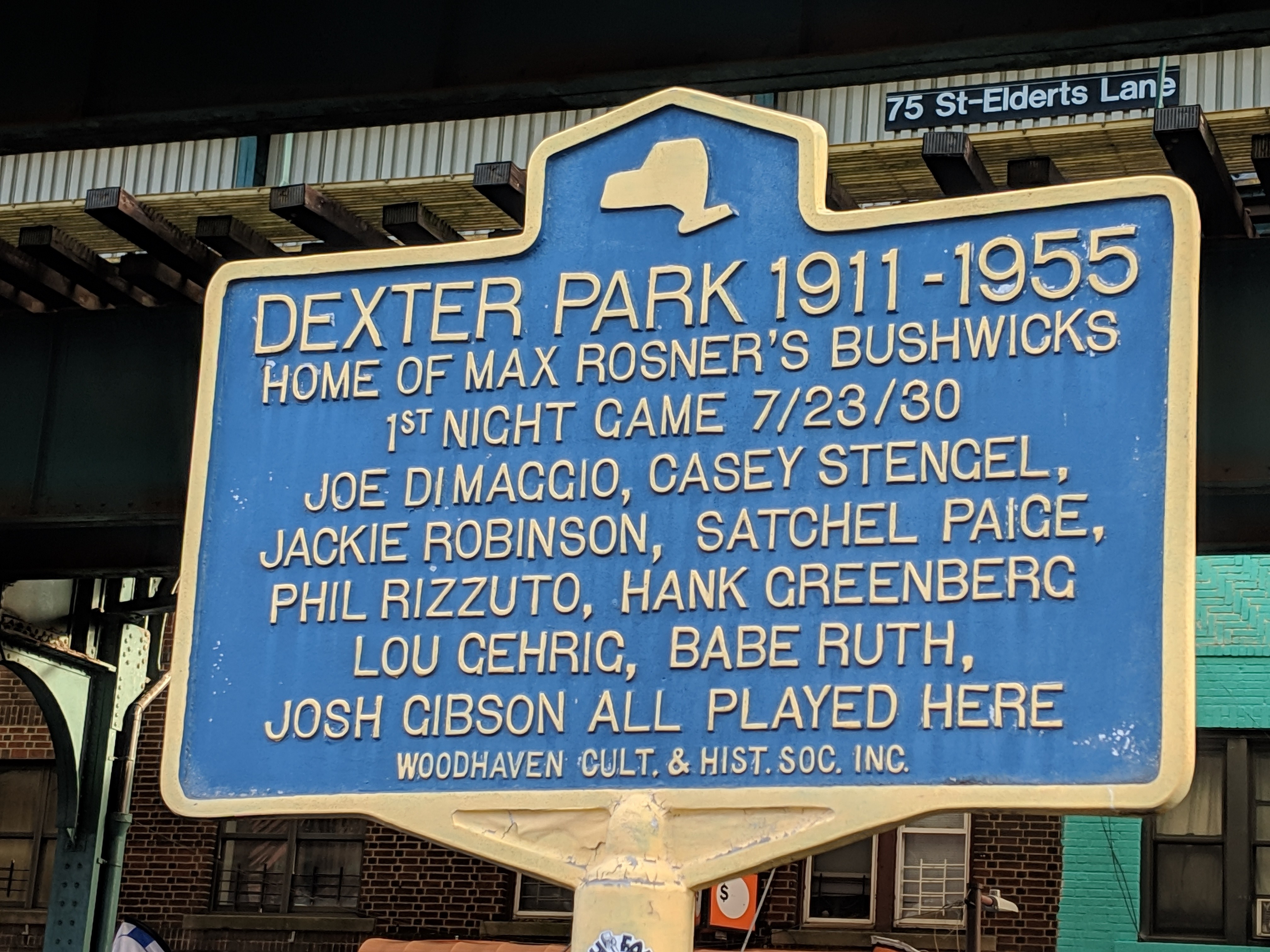
Dexter Field, Home to Brooklyn Bushwicks, Negro Leagues

Dexter Park was the home of the Brooklyn Bushwicks, an independent semi-pro team that played there from 1913 until 1951. The park was purchased for them from the Ulmer Brewery in 1922. The Bushwicks played many teams in the Negro leagues, as well as various All-Star teams; the club was owned by Max Rosner, who eventually purchased Dexter Park as well. The lighting system, first used on July 23, 1930, was among the first permanent lighting systems for night baseball in the U.S. and the first in New York City (Ebbets Field was not lighted for the Dodgers until 1938) and was designed and installed by Max Rosner's son, Herman Rosner, who was an electrical engineer.

Many former Major League ballplayers were featured on the Bushwicks, such as the Cuccinello brothers, Tony and Al. Josh Gibson once hit a home run over the 30-foot high wall behind the 418-foot deep left-center bleachers. Other semi-pro teams called Dexter home, including the Brooklyn Farmers in the 1920s and 1930s.

By the early 1950s, screening of major league games on television in New York City dried up the audiences for semi-pro ball, and the Bushwicks folded after the 1951 season.

== Soccer ==
Dexter Park set an attendance high for a National Challenge Cup (now U.S. Open Cup) final on April 7, 1929. Despite an official capacity of only 15,400, a whopping 21,583 fans jammed into Dexter to watch New York Hakoah defeat St. Louis Madison Kennel, 2–0. It was the largest crowd to see an Open Cup Final for more than 80 years, until October 5, 2010, when 31,311 attended an Open Cup final at Qwest Field in Seattle.

== Football and other sports ==
High school and college football games were also held at Dexter Park, attracting crowds near 10,000 at times. On November 1, 1930, a section of the stands seating 500 fans collapsed during a game; luckily, no one was hurt, and Jamaica went on to defeat Richmond Hill, 25–2, to claim the all-Queens title. Boxing under the lights at Dexter was also popular, with over 150 cards held there from 1914 to 1950. On May 24, 1926, 10,000 spectators braved unexpectedly cold weather to witness the first card of the year, disputing one result so loudly that the announcer was unable to introduce the next bout. (US Army welterweight champion Eddie Burnbrook knocked out Willie Dillon in the main contest.) Roller derby and rodeo were also seen at Dexter Park from time to time.

== Racing ==
With the decline of semi-pro ball, stock car racing was added to the site on April 15, 1951, and continued until 1955. The main sanctioning body on Long Island was the Allstate Racing Stock Car Club, the officers of whom were mostly drivers and racecar owners who were expanding operations from Freeport Stadium.

But ticket sales were lackluster, and the park was sitting on choice real estate. So, in 1955, Dexter Park was sold, torn down in 1957, and replaced by one- and two-family houses, as well as a supermarket now owned by the CTown chain.

== See also ==
- Neir's Tavern
- Union Course
