= Nancy Hanks (horse) =

American Standardbred racehorse

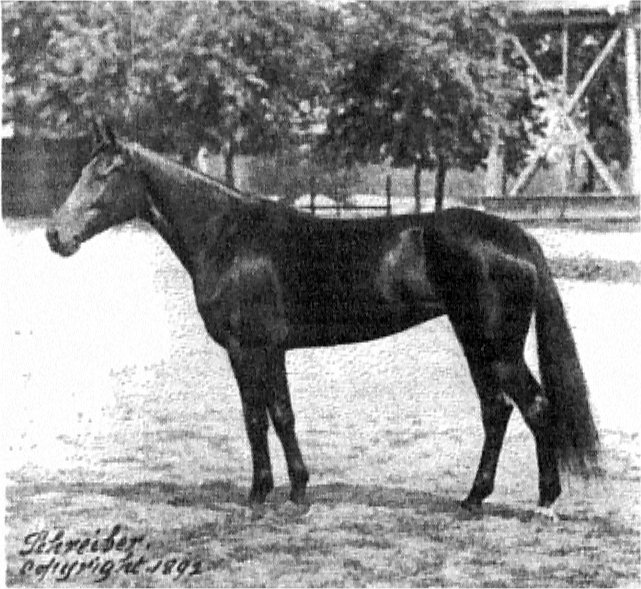

Nancy Hanks (1886 – August 16, 1915) was an undefeated Standardbred trotting mare named for Abraham Lincoln's mother. She was the first 2:05 trotter in harness-racing history.

She was foaled in 1886 on what is now known as Poplar Hill Farm, near Lexington, Kentucky. Bred by Hart Boswell, she was sired by Happy Medium; her dam, Nancy Lee, was by Dictator.

While owned by John Malcolm Forbes, on September 28, 1892, the brown mare trotted a mile in 2 minutes and 4 seconds at Terre Haute's Four Cornered Track with a bicycle sulky, breaking all Sunol's mark of 2 minutes 8.25 seconds set in 1891. Nancy Hanks lost one race heat (in her first start), but was undefeated in her races. She was inducted into the Harness Racing Museum & Hall of Fame in 1955.

Nancy Hanks died on August 16, 1915, at age 29, and is buried in the Hamburg Place equine cemetery. A statue of her was created by sculptor Charles Cary Rumsey.

A passenger train from Atlanta to Savannah from 1947 to 1971 was named in her honor.

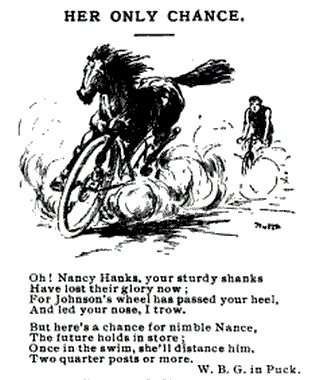
Poem about Nancy Hanks Racehorse and Cyclists in 1892
