= Robert E. Bonner =

American newspaper publisher

Robert Bonner
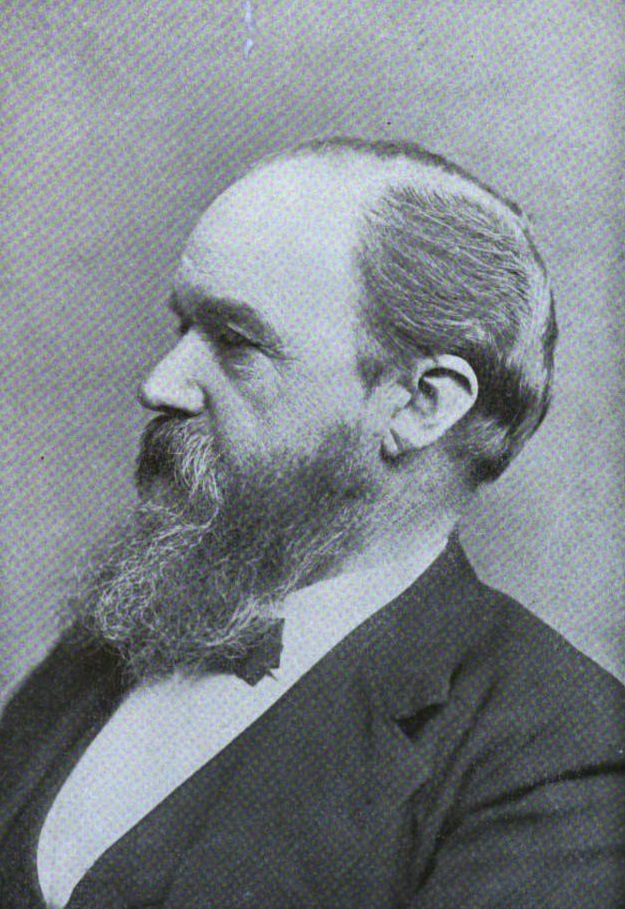
- Born: April 28, 1824; Ireland
- Died: July 6, 1899 (aged 75)
- Occupations: Businessman; Newspaper columnist, publisher; Standardbred racehorse owner; philanthropist
- Spouse: Jane McConlis (m. 1850; died 1878)
- Children: 3 sons, 3 daughters

Robert Edwin Bonner (April 28, 1824 – July 6, 1899) was an American publisher, now best known for The New York Ledger, a weekly story newspaper. He owned famous trotting horses and he was a prominent supporter of the Presbyterian Church and Pastor John Hall.

Bonner was born in Ireland, in the town of Ramelton, Co Donegal; his ancestors were Scottish Presbyterians. He arrived in America in 1839, where his uncle owned land in Hartford, Connecticut. Bonner became an apprentice in the printing trade and worked at the Hartford Courant. There he was an extraordinarily fast compositor. Completing his apprenticeship in 1844, he moved to New York and worked for the organ of the new American Republican Party (later Native American; Know-Nothing) while he lived by "practicing the most rigid economy". When it suspended operation he found work at The Evening Mirror, a daily launched in 1844. He began writing and contributed to various newspapers in other cities.

He worked at The Merchant's Ledger, a financial weekly, in the advertising department and became involved with printing that newspaper. He purchased it in 1851 and changed the name to The New York Ledger in 1855, when he sought a wider readership by running articles by well-known writers. He also used advertising to raise the profile of the paper and increase the circulation.

== Harness racing owner ==
Coat of Arms of Robert E. Bonner

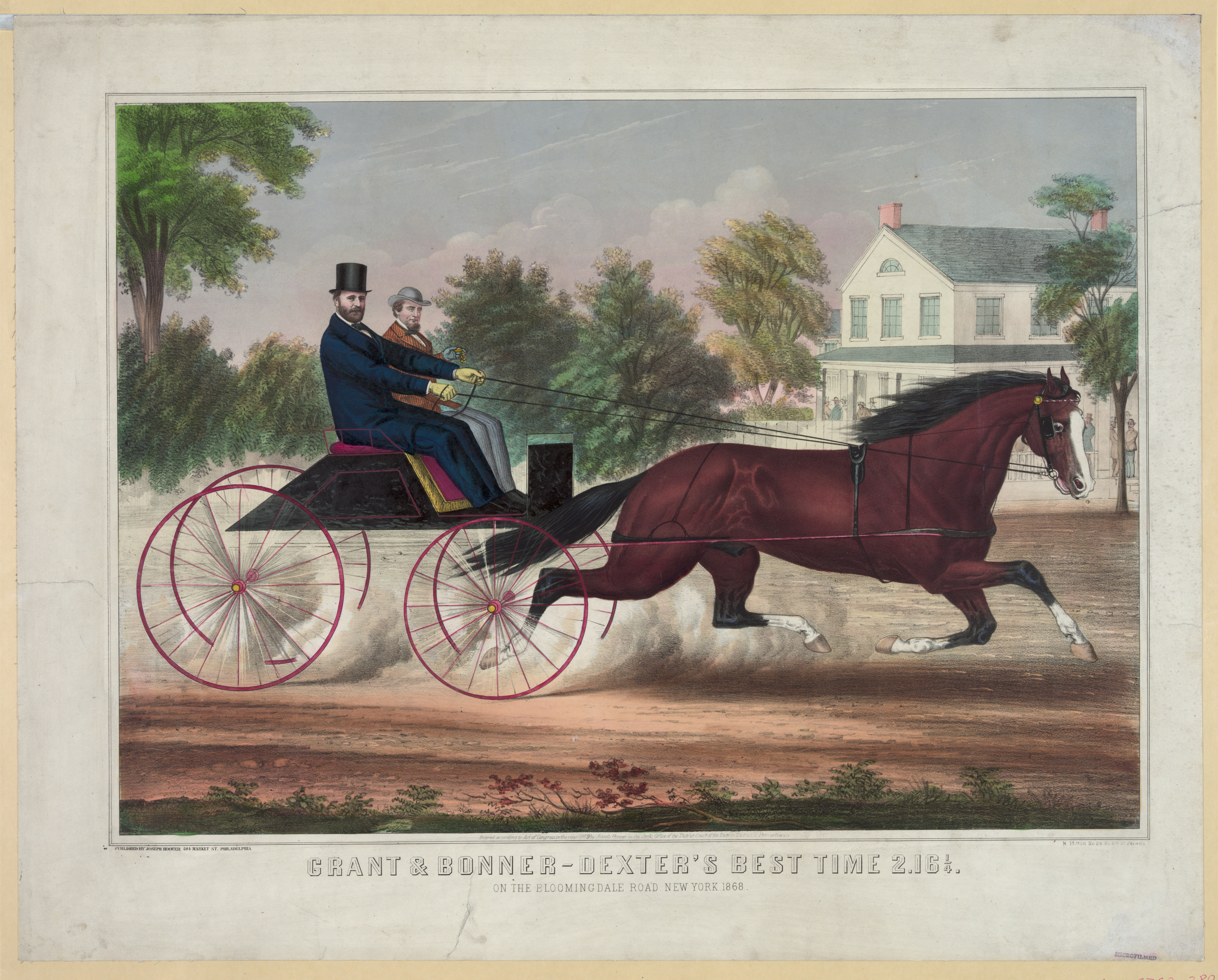
Bonner and Ulysses S. Grant racing in a carriage in New York, as depicted in an 1868 lithograph

Around 1856, Bonner became interested in horses and, in particular, the "trotting" form of harness racing. He paid large sums for his horses; one of the most famous was Dexter, a gelding that cost him $35,000. He did not gamble or race for money, but there was a rivalry between Bonner and Commodore Vanderbilt over who had the best horses. At one time, he was president of the New York Driving Club. In 1893, he was presented with a silver sculpture of his trotting horse, Sunol being driven by Charles Marvin. A bronze copy of the Cyrus Dallin sculpture is in the collection of the Harness Racing Museum & Hall of Fame in Goshen, New York.

== Philanthropy ==
Bonner was a philanthropist who preferred not to make his donations public, but he was a known supporter of Princeton University and contributed $131,000 towards the Fifth Avenue Presbyterian Church. He was also president of the Scotch-Irish Society of America.

== Family ==
Bonner married Jane McConlis in 1850 and they had six children although one child, Martha Agnes, died in infancy. Bonner's wife Jane died in 1878.

== Legacy ==
In 1887, he passed the Ledger to his three sons. Robert Bonner's Sons published dime novels, too. Their office was on the corner of Williams Street and Spruce Street.

Pastor John Hall died in September 1898 in Ireland and one son, Andrew Allen Bonner, died in December 1898. According to his obituary, Bonner never recovered from the shocks; his health and interest failed. He was confined to a bed at times during June and he died on July 6, 1899. He was survived by sons Robert Edwin and Frederick and daughter Mrs. Francis Forbes.

Bonner is the namesake of the city of Bonner Springs, Kansas.

Upon his 1899 death, he was interred in Green-Wood Cemetery in Brooklyn, New York.
