= Harry Clay (horse) =

American-bred Standardbred racehorse

- Breed: Standardbred
- Sire: Cassius M. Clay Jr.
- Grandsire: Cassius M. Clay
- Dam: Fan
- Damsire: Imp. Bellfounder
- Sex: Stallion
- Foaled: 1853
- Died: 1887
- Country: United States
- Colour: Black
- Breeder: J. Decatur Sayre
- Record: 2:29

Harry Clay (1853–1887), also known as Sayre's Harry Clay, was an American trotting horse who became a famed broodmare sire.

== Origin and early years ==
Harry Clay was bred by J. D. Sayre of Westtown, Orange County, New York, United States.

Foaled in 1853, he was a black stallion with a white face and legs. He was sired by Neave's Cassius M. Clay Jr. (1848) and came from a distinguished line through Cassius M. Clay, Henry Clay, Andrew Jackson, Young Bashaw, and Grand Bashaw, a Barb horse imported from Tripoli. His father's dam was by Chancellor, a son of Mambrino, who was by Messenger.

Harry Clay's dam was Fan, by the famed Norfolk trotter imported Bellfounder. The granddam of Harry Clay, Bellfounder, came from England in 1822, brought by James Boott of Boston, Massachusetts.

Harry Dator, a well-known figure at Union Course, persuaded Sayre to reduce Harry Clay's price from $5,000 to $3,000. Dator had already entered Harry Clay in a race before purchasing him, and the horse's impressive speed won enough prize money to cover his cost. Harry Clay later passed to Darius Tallman of Long Island, then to Mr. Pierce of Chicago, and finally returned to New York under William Waltermire, a cattle dealer.

== Racing career ==
Harry Clay, driven on Harlem Lane by Waltermire's daughter, could trot a mile in 2:39, with a record of 2:29. He competed in numerous races and held his place as a leading trotter of the Clay family line.

Harry Clay spent many years in Albany, New York, after being purchased by Erastus Corning and became long admired among horsemen. At age 26, he was sold at the breeder's request during Peter C. Kellogg's annual New York sale of thoroughbred and trotting stock on March 27, 1879, fetching $1,000 and going to J. D. Willis of Middletown, Orange County.

== Stud record ==
While Harry Clay neither founded a line nor produced notable trotters himself, his daughters earned him lasting renown.

He gained fame as a broodmare sire, with five standard performers, sixteen producing sons, and twenty-three producing daughters to his credit. Harry Clay's daughters produced 26 trotters with mile records from 2:11 to 2:30, which were very fast for the era. Among Harry Clay's daughters, the two most notable producers were Green Mountain Maid and Flora. The dam of Green Mountain Maid was Shanghai Mary, whose breeding was unknown. Green Mountain Maid produced Prospero (2:20), Elaine (2:20), Dame Trott (2:22), Mansfield (2:26), Storm (2:26¾), and Antonio (2:28¾). Flora was the dam of St. Julien (2:11¼), Unolala (2:22¼), and St. Remo (2:28½). Electioneer, whose dam was Green Mountain Maid by Harry Clay, produced eight under 2:20 and thirty more at 2:30. Harry Clay sired a mare with Nellie Sayre, by Seeley's American Star. Their daughter Hattie Hogan produced nine mares that produced fifteen 2:30 performers with records ranging from 2:11¼ to 2:30. He was also the sire of Lady Ross (2:29 ¾), Surprise (2:26), and Black Harry Clay.

Many once believed that Harry Clay sired Dexter because of Dexter's markings similar to Clay Trotting Horses.

== Death ==
Harry Clay died on April 6, 1887, at age 34.

When Harry Clay died, he was owned by J. D. Willis, who operated a stud farm where the Orange County Fair Speedway now stands.

== Legacy ==
At 34 years old, Harry Clay lived longer than any of the other renowned sires. Sayre's Harry Clay was the sire of the dams of several notable trotters, including St. Julien (2:11¼), Bodine (2:19½), Prospero (2:20), Gazelle (2:21), Dame Trott (2:22), James Howell Jr. (2:24), Elaine (2:24¼), and Hogarth (2:26).

The track where Harry Clay trained in his prime became known as the Harry Clay Oval, now the Orange County Fair Speedway.

== See also ==
- List of racehorses
