= Historic sites in Marlboro Township, New Jersey =

Marlboro Township, New Jersey has a number of historic sites. The Monmouth County Historic Site Inventory (HSI) was started in 1980 by the directors of both the Monmouth County Historical Association and the Monmouth County Park System. This inventory project provided an inventory number to all historic properties in Monmouth County, New Jersey. In addition to property details, this listing provides reference numbers for easy identification. In addition to the park system inventory, the Marlboro Township Historic Commission provides a listing of Historic Commission Landmarks (HCL). These are physical signs placed in historically significant locations. There was also a list presented by the NJ Department of Environmental Protection - Historic Preservation Office (HPO).

== Listings ==
- Here is a listing of historically relevant property and buildings in Marlboro as referenced by the HSI, HCL and the HPO:

Name	HSI	Status	HCL	HPO	Notes
McCarron House			No		Roof repaired in 2015 and windows replaced in 2016 - Preserved Farmland 2021
Morganville School			Yes		Original part of school built circa 1850.
Old Robertsville School			Yes		Built circa 1822
Retreat of the British Army			Yes		Sign located at 52 Dutch Lane Road
Marlboro Village	1328-01			--	Designated region of the older part of Marlboro Village
Old Marlboro Township Hall	1328-01-01	Lost	No		Building converted to restaurant - original part no longer identifiable
Marlboro Hotel	1328-01-02	Demolished	Yes		Was on the parking lot next to firehouse
Liberty Grange	1328-01-03		Yes		Building converted to office
Addison Hobart House	1328-01-05		Yes		Converted to art studio
Dutch Reformed Chapel	1328-01-03		Yes		Converted to dance studio
EE Brewer House	1328-01-08		No		
WE Brewer House	1328-01-07		No		
JR Stout House	1328-01-06		No		
Collins Blacksmith and Wheelwright Shop	1328-01-09		No		
Dimeo Farm	1328-02	House demolished	No		House was demolished 2015. The barn is standing but is currently at risk.
Federal Hall	1328-04		Yes		
Conover House	1328-03		No		
Currently unknown	1328-07	Demolished	--		This number skipped in the HSI sequence.
Marlboro Psychiatric Hospital	1328-08	Demolished	No	Yes	Register of Historic Places
Collier Estate			Yes		Converted to a high school
Jacob Van Dorn House	1328-06		No		
Currently unknown	1328-05	Demolished	No		This number skipped in the HSI sequence.
St. Gabriel Roman Catholic Church	1328-11		Yes		
Old Brick Reformed Church	1328-10		Yes		
Van Dorn Ely Farm	1328-09	Demolished	No		
Medical Director Home	1328-12	Demolished	No		Home for the Marlboro Psychiatric Hospital Medical Director
Reed Schanck Farm	1328-13	Demolished	No		
Currently unknown	1328-14	Demolished	No		This number skipped in the HSI sequence.
LaFayette Conover Farm	1328-15		No		
Asher Holmes House	1328-16		No	Yes	Condition of structure poor; aka "Old Kentuck"
Dr. Gordon Home	1328-17	Demolished	No		Burned down
Hortensia Farm	1328-18	Demolished	Yes		Burned down
J.H. Rue's Potato Warehouse	1328-19	Lost	No		Converted to pre-school
David Vanderveer House	1328-20		No		
VanMater House	1328-21		No		
Liberty Hall	1328-22	Demolished	No		Land used for condos
Morganville Methodist Episcopal Church	1328-23		No		
Tylee Schanck House	1328-24		No		
Uriah Smock House	1328-26		No		
Marlboro Railroad Depot	1328-27		No		Currently reconverted to an office
Garret I. Conover Farm	1328-28		No		
Vanderveer House	1328-29		Yes		Built circa 1722
Van Kirk Farm	1328-25		No	Yes	HPO ID# 3727; aka Benjamin Vanderveer House

- When the creator of this inventory was asked about the missing number in the Inventory; the response was that the missing inventory numbers ("currently unknown") may indicate that the building no longer exists, or was demolished during the listing process.
- The Historical Sites Inventory is now an abandoned project. The document is still available on request from the Monmouth County Park System.

== Addison Hobart House ==
The house was built in 1828. The Marlboro Historic Commission placed a marker at 9 North Main Street. The marker states "This was once the home of Addison Hobart, a businessman, teacher, postmaster, and Commissioner of Deeds. Garret Hobart, his son, lived in this house and later entered politics, ultimately becoming Vice President of the United States in 1896 under William McKinley. Garret Hobart died in 1899." The building is located on North Main Street in Marlboro, immediately next to the fire house.

At one point when Garret Hobart lived in this house he was a school teacher before going to college at Rutgers.

The house is currently used as an art studio.

The building is a wood-framed, two-story, three-bay "T-Plan" Greek Revival style structure. There are two ridge chimneys and 6/6 sash windows. The foundation is constructed of brick. There is a plaque on the house which dates it to 1938.

It was owned by A.W. Hobart for much of the mid-19th century; he ran a hardware store and grocery in the next lot (torn down).

The Monmouth county Historic Site Inventory number is 1328–01–05.

== Asher Holmes House ==
Called "Old Kentuck", the home was most noteworthy for a person who lived at and owned the property, Revolutionary War hero Colonel Asher Holmes.

The home is located on Pleasant Valley Road in Marlboro Township. Built before 1770, it was placed on the National Register of Historic Places on November 6, 1973.

The structure is currently considered unsafe for any type of activity or entry. It seems to have been abandoned for the last 20–30 years.

The house faces south with the back of the structure to the road. There do not appear to be structural changes in the past 150 years. Inside the building are double parlors, a central hall, Dutch doors and four chimneys. The outside has original cypress shingles. The house had an addition connected to it, but the smaller section is the original part, which dates to the mid-1700s. There appears to have been a smoke house in the attic. This was discovered many years ago when it was found there is a smaller squared-off space where a fifth chimney may have been at one point that contains meat hooks attached to the rafters. There is a basement under the whole house except for a room off the kitchen. The dining room is of native field stone. Dutch construction suggests the builder of the original structure was not English. The first recorded owner of this property was Asher Holmes. This may mean the person who built this house was not Holmes but someone of Dutch heritage; Holmes likely purchased the home from that person.

== Beacon Hill ==
Beacon Hill, New Jersey is the second highest point in the county and was used as a lookout point towards the Raritan Bay. During the Revolutionary War, Col. Asher Holmes was ordered to construct three beacons as part of statewide warning beacons should the British attempt to land in Raritan Bay or Sandy Hook. Used as a signal to local militia of British invasion, each pyramid of logs was 18 feet (5.5 m) high and 20 feet (6.1 m) wide. When filled with brush and lit, the fires could be seen throughout the area.

== Collier Estate ==
The main house was built circa 1904. The Marlboro Township Historic Commission posted a sign for this structure at the street entrance to the property now owned by the Sisters of the Good Shepherd, Pleasant Valley Road. The significance of the building was that it was used as a "Rest Hill".

It was an assemblage of many old farmsteads, purchased for a vacation home by magazine publisher Peter F. Collier. His son Robert was an aviation enthusiast who purchased the first Wright Brothers biplane and housed it at the estate using the field as a runway. This plane provided pilot training for Sir Thomas Sopwith, who went on to build many of the airplanes used in World War I. The property was the site of many large-scale parties, some attended by 2,500 people.

The porch is a replica of Mount Vernon.

Robert's widow, Sarah Van Alen, donated the estate in 1927 to the Sisters of the Good Shepherd. It was later converted to a high school and residence for children at risk.

== Collins Blacksmith and Wheelwright Shop ==
Built circa 1910, this is a two-story frame shop near Main Street with a gable roof, weatherboard siding, and sliding double doors. The lot was the site of blacksmith and wheelwright shops throughout the 19th century. The blacksmith shop was built by Hollands. It is now used as storage for antique farm equipment.

It has the New Jersey Historic Sites Inventory number 1328-01-9.

== Conover House ==
The main house was destroyed by fire in 1991. The course was built c. 1840 with 1893 alterations. It was 2 1/2 stories, and the main doorway had Greek Revival elements. A second large old house (c. 1850?) and an elaborate barn complex remain on the property.

It has the New Jersey Historic Sites Inventory number 1328-03.

== Dutch Reformed Chapel ==
The Marlboro Dutch Reformed Chapel was a Christian church created in downtown Marlboro by the Old Brick Dutch Reformed Church. Built in 1869 on Main Street, its function was to serve as an alternative meeting place when weather or other events required a meeting closer to town.

The building is an L-shaped wood-framed clapboard structure with intersecting gabled roof and a bell tower. Currently lost, the front of the structure had long thin stained glass windows which framed a semi-circular transom front double doorway. The building is 25 × 40 feet and was erected for $2,725.

Marlboro Township Historic Commission placed a sign outside the structure which states, "A vernacular Victorian building with Romanesque elements, this chapel was used in the winter since the main church on Route 520 in the Bradevelt section had no heat. Several additions were added to the original chapel over time. The bell in the tower tolled until 1969 when the building was sold. The bell is now on the property of the main church."

The church has a Monmouth County historic site inventory number, 1328–01–04.

== Federal Hall ==
Built circa 1740 and once owned by the Ely family, the Federal style house resembles a steamboat with a rounded north end. The smokehouse and ice house remain intact. During the early 19th century, the house served as an inn. The house is one of a few of this style left in the country.

== Hortensia ==
The property was deeded by King Charles II of England and built in 1686 by John Reid, County Judge and Surveyor-General of East Jersey and Commissioner of Highways for the county. Hortensia was a tract of 200 acres situated on the east branch of the Hop Brook.

The home was originally occupied by John Reid (1656–1723) and his wife Margaret (1644–1728) as well as their children Anna, Helena and John. Following their ownership, the property was purchased by the Schancks and then Freylinghuysens. Following the Freylinghuysens' death the estate was sold at auction to a housing developer; it was knocked down for individual home construction.

The property received the name after a family home in England. The property was passed down and divided to Anna and Helena as their "respective marriage portions".

The structure originally consisted of four rooms, but was expanded over the years. There were two major expansions in 1720 and 1820. The home expanded to about 15 rooms and a few additional out-buildings. In 1947, the owner at the time stated the original structure formed the main living room of the house. During reconstruction, the walls were originally found to be lined with rush and mud for insulation.

The Marlboro Township Historic Commission placed a sign, now lost, on Pleasant Valley Road near the Hop (now called "Winding") Brook. The sign stated, "This was the site of a home built by John Reid, an early settler. As a New Jersey surveyor, Reid drew the dividing line between East and West New Jersey, an early important geographical boundary. The New Jersey Historic Sites Inventory called the site an important farmstead and the home a notable architectural example. It was demolished in the 1990s."

== J. Van Kirk Farm ==
This is also known as the Benjamin Vanderveer House. Listed on the HPO as ID number 3727, the farm is located at 107 Vanderburg Road, Marlboro.

== Liberty Hall-Hardy Blacksmith Shop ==
Liberty Hall, which also went by the name of Alfred Hardy & Son Blacksmith Shop, was a small brick building located on Route 79 in the small section of Morganville. The building was reportedly built around 1880. The building name could faintly be seen in scripted letters painted over the door of the building. The blacksmith shop operated into the early 20th century and was one of the last blacksmith operations in the area. Following its closing, the building housed a machine shop until 1942 when a small defense contractor, Lavoie Laboratories, bought it to produce radio gear for the military. In 1966, Lavoie sold it to Entron Industries, a manufacturer of missile circuitry that occupied the building until the mid-1970s. The building was torn down in June 2012 after being in disrepair and abandoned. There is now a townhouse development on the site.

== Liberty Grange ==
Originally a Baptist church, the site was taken over by the Liberty Grange #99 in the 1930s. The building was constructed in 1866 on Route 79 (Main Street) and Vanderburg Road; Block 94 - lot 8. It was built in the Greek Revival style, one-story three-bay rectangular form. Originally with a bell tower, long since removed, the building was converted to use as a meeting hall for the Liberty Grange members and then later sold and converted to offices when the Grange closed. It has a reference number of 1328–01–03.

== Marlborough Hotel ==
The Marlboro Township Historic Commission sign is located on School Road West, at the northwest corner of School Road West and Route 79 (Main Street). It was located on Block 90 - Lot 6. The sign reads, "A tavern and inn, owned by John Buck, stood on this site in 1780, in this area once called 'Buckstown'. The Marlboro Hotel was built in 1845 at this stagecoach stop by Hiriah Smalley and served as a gathering place until 1919. The hotel was demolished in 1996."

The hotel was originally known as "Bucks Tavern", which was a one-acre site. It was changed to "Rogers Tavern" during the Revolutionary War.

The original Marlborough Hotel was torn down in 1844, and the following year the most recent building was constructed. It was a 2 1/2-story five-bay wood-framed building with federal elements. There were two sets of twin end wall chimneys and asbestos shingle siding. There were a number of sleeping rooms, two parlors, a bar and a dining room for fifty guests. In the back of the building was a large stable for the horses and a good livery. It was then used as a roadside tavern and hotel. At some point following the township receiving the name "Marlborough", the tavern became known by this name.

Following 1919 the need to have a stop on the road diminished and its use changed. It became a mixed use building with apartment residences upstairs and various stores in the bottom part of the structure until it was shuttered and then abandoned in the late 1980s. The commercial businesses included a bank, sweet shop and meat market. The structure was unused until it was torn down over ten years later, to make room for a parking lot for the Marlboro Township fire department.

== Marlboro Township Hall ==
Located on the east side of North Main Street, Marlboro Township Hall was built in the late 19th century. It was a one-story frame building with gable roof and clapboard siding. When the township moved to the present location, the building was sold. It was not demolished but enveloped in expansion of a Chinese restaurant, and is no longer visible in that form. The Monmouth County Historic Site inventory number is 1328–01–01.

== Marlboro Tree ==
Discovered in 1997 and located near one of the Big Brook tributaries, The Marlboro Tree, a massive black willow tree, has been certified by the New Jersey Forest Service as a "State Champion" tree, signifying that it is the largest known tree of its species in the State of New Jersey, and the largest tree of any kind in Marlboro Township. It is about 152 years old and measures 76 feet (23 m) high and 19' 8" in circumference. Five grown people must hold hands to fully encircle the tree.

== Morganville School ==
The Morganville School was built circa 1850. It is located on Route 79 near the Beacon Hill Road. This is a Marlboro Township Historic Commission Landmark.

There is a sign at this location which states, "The original three-room schoolhouse, built on land donated by the Morgan family, had fine woodwork and pressed-tin ceilings. In response to township growth, there was construction of several additions in later years. The Marlboro school system used this school from 1915 until the mid-1970s when it was then leased to the Coastal Learning Center."

The Coastal Learning Center is now closed and the building is sitting idle. It had a for sale sign in front of it for a few years but has since been withdrawn from sale.

== Old Brick Dutch Reformed Church and Cemetery ==
This church was known as the Freehold-Middletown Dutch Congregation (now Old Brick Church). The names of Dutch residents who attended this church appear in the early records and grave stones dating from 1709 (early records were written in Dutch). When services began, circa 1699, the preachers would come across the bay in small boats from Long Island to reach the people of the parish. It is currently known as the Old Brick Reformed Church.

The Marlboro Township Historic Commission placed a sign at 490 Route 520, which states, "Founded by Dutch settlers, the present church was erected in 1826 and is the oldest established operative church in Marlboro. The early ministers rowed across from Brooklyn to lead services, which were held in the Dutch language until 1764. The first American-born pastor, Benjamin Dubois, is buried here. An avid American patriot in the struggle for independence, Pastor Dubois took up arms against British incursions."

== Old Marlboro Township Hall ==
The building served as the Marlboro Township municipal town hall from the 1890s to the mid-1960s. This was a late 19th-century wood-frame building. It had a brick foundation and concrete veneer with a shed-roof porch. It was located on the east side of Route 79 (Main Street), which was also block 94 - lot 2. The building was not torn down but used as the base for the expanded Chinese restaurant which now sits on this property. The building was lost in the expansion and is not currently recognizable as the original town hall structure in its current form.

== Old Robertsville School ==
Originally built in 1832, Robertsville Elementary School was once a one-room schoolhouse that was built on the corner of Tennent and Union Hill Roads. It was remodeled/rebuilt in 1912 and used for special education purposes at that time. This building is still standing today. The current Robertsville School was constructed in 1968 down the road from the original schoolhouse. It is believed to have been named after Matthew Roberts, a prominent businessman in the day.

This is a Marlboro Township Historical Commission Landmark location. The Historical Commission has a sign located on the corner of Tennent Road and Union Hill Road which reads, "The first school building on this site also was used for Methodist services by the congregation that evolved into the Robertsville Bible Church. The church constructed its own building in 1833. By 1912, the original schoolhouse was replaced with the present building. It is no longer used by students."

In 1946, the building had no running water, no central heating or air conditioning and no bathrooms. There was a well and long handled pump near the front of the school which was used for drinking water. There were two outhouses in the back of the property used by the students. There was a pot belly wood fired stove inside near the entrance door which was used to heat the building during the winter. The teacher, (Reba Grant Scharff), taught 4 grade levels made up of children from the local farms and homes in Robertsville.

== Old Saint Gabriel's Church ==
This church was built in 1878. It is located on Route 520, in the Bradeveldt section of Marlboro. The significance of this building was its use by the congregation of St. Gabriel. Organized in 1871, the congregation constructed this Victorian Gothic church in 1878. Although a new church and rectory were constructed on Route 79 in 1972, and a parish center in the 1980s, this building has remained in continuous use, and is frequently used for weddings and other events.

== Old Scots Burying Ground ==
On the National Register of Historic Places since August 2001, Old Scots Burying Ground was established around 1705.

Under active study, archaeologist Gerard Scharfenberger is working to excavate the foundation of the original Old Scots Meeting House as well as any unmarked graves on the property. This is the original location where the congregation of the Old Tennent Presbyterian Church once met. It is also part of the site where the Battle of Monmouth was fought. John Boyd, the first Presbyterian minister trained in the New World, was buried here in 1708.

== Retreat of the British Army ==
The Battle of Monmouth as well as a number of skirmishes were fought near Marlboro Township during the American Revolutionary War. Many area placards and signs can be found on the local roads to identify specific local events from the battle. Marlboro Township area farms were often raided by the British for food supplies and livestock. Following defeat in this battle, the British retreated from the area to their ships in the bay. Monmouth Battlefield State Park, nearby in Freehold Township and Manalapan Township, provides local reference to this historic event.

A Historic Commission Marker located at 52 Dutch Lane Road reads, "Retreat of the British Army, June 1778 - Following their defeat at the Battle of Monmouth during the Revolutionary War, the British forces retreated down Dutch Lane Road under the cover of darkness. The troops were subject to heavy sniper fire from the Monmouth Militia as they sought to reach a British fleet anchored off Sandy Hook."

== September 11 Memorial ==
A memorial was constructed in memory of the 14 township residents killed in the September 11, 2001 terrorist attacks. Located near the Marlboro Recreation Center on the side of the main parking lot, it consists of a circle of flowering dogwoods, surrounding benches and a memorial fountain on the township municipal grounds. It features a 12-foot steel “I” beam recovered from the World Trade Center. The memorial was badly damaged and was renovated after a serious motor vehicle accident in 2009. It is located at GPS: 40.32754, -74.26351

== Topanemus Cemetery ==
The cemetery dates back to the 1600s. Many of the area founding fathers from Freehold, Bayshore, Matawan, and Marlboro are buried there. Other important people in the founding of Monmouth County such as John Reid, John Anderson, and Thomas Warne, as well as four of Matawan's original 24 founders, are buried here. It developed out of the need for a cemetery for the Topanemus settlement, an original settlement for the Marlboro area. The cemetery is believed to be the oldest in Monmouth County, apart from some individual sequestered family burial plots. Some of the tombstones were brought from Scotland in the ballast of crossing ships, and were hand carved in Perth Amboy, New Jersey. The cemetery is known to contain many historically significant and famous people of the time. There are believed to be 112 known graves in the cemetery.

== Uriah Smock House ==
The Uriah Smock Farm was part of a property known as the Homestead Farm. It was the property of Uriah's father, John H. Smock. In February 1810, John purchased two contiguous tracts of land totaling 167 acres in Freehold Township from his father, Hendrick Smock, for $7,000. The land on which the Uriah Smock house later stood had been purchased by Hendrick from George Smock in January 1810.

The exact construction date of the Smock house could not be obtained through documentary research. Judging by the architectural style and existing historical information, the house can roughly be dated from between circa 1830 to before 1848. It appears to have been built by John H. Smock (1781–1865) and his son Uriah Smock (1815–1881). Given John's age (49) in 1830 it is likely that the house was redone or entirely rebuilt with Greek Revival details when the style came into vogue. The original house may have been built in the late 1700s. There is also the possibility that the Smocks lived elsewhere until deciding to build a house on the farm. Sources place John H. Smock in Freehold Township during this period, including the record of him serving as deacon at the Dutch Reformed Church on and off from 1810 through 1816, and a record of the manumission of a slave, Betty Thomas, in 1825. Greek Revival style houses were popular during this period in the township.

The farmhouse appeared on the 1861 map of Monmouth County and in the F.W. Beers 1873 atlas. The inset of Marlboro village in the 1873 map shows the lane leading directly from the village to the farmhouse.

During Uriah Smock's tenure on the property, he farmed 100 acres and owned between 37 and 50 additional unimproved acres. He was known to harvest and ship marl from his farm. He was recorded in the agricultural censuses with horses, cows, and swine, among other livestock, a mixed crop of grains, mostly corn, and many bushels of Irish potatoes. He maintained an apple orchard of 250 trees, and produced garden vegetables. His property now is largely the Lexington Development, which was constructed circa 2000. The Smock Home was preserved as part of an agreement with the Township of Marlboro.

== Vanderveer House ==
Vanderveer House was built circa 1722; had an addition in 1840 and a complete restoration in 1995. In 1906, there were some minor renovations consisting of an outside door to the library and some minor outside improvements. It is not largely visible from the road. There is a Marlboro Township Historic Commission sign at the road at location 176 Ryan Road which reads, "Original elements still remain in this Colonial home, which once belonged to Tunis Vanderveer, a large landowner. The house was used as a locating point in drawing the boundaries of Marlborough Township in 1848 when it became independent from Freehold Township."
