= Electioneer (horse) =

American Standardbred stallion (1868–1890)

- Electioneer, depicted in an 1891 lithograph by Louis Maurer
- Sire: Hambletonian 10
- Grandsire: Abdallah
- Dam: Green Mountain Maid
- Damsire: Harry Clay
- Sex: Stallion
- Foaled: May 2, 1868
- Died: December 3, 1890 (aged 22)
- Country: United States
- Color: Bay
- Breeder: Charles Backman
- Owner: Leland Stanford

Awards
- U.S. Harness Racing Hall of Fame (1955)

Electioneer (May 2, 1868 – December 3, 1890) was an American Standardbred stallion. Bred by Charles Backman in New York, he was later acquired by Leland Stanford for his Palo Alto Stock Farm in California.

== Background ==
Electioneer was a bay horse bred by Charles Backman and foaled at Stony Ford Farm in Campbell Hall, New York, United States, on May 2, 1868. He was sired by Hambletonian 10 out of Green Mountain Maid, a daughter of Harry Clay. He was the second foal of Green Mountain Maid and the only offspring produced from breeding with Hambletonian. His grandam was Shanghai Mary, a mare whose pedigree was undocumented. At maturity, Electioneer stood 15½ hands high.

Electioneer was never entered in competition or trained to establish an official harness racing record. He exercised daily on the Stony Ford Farm track, including being driven to a wagon during his three-year-old season. Although he received some early training, he was used only occasionally for breeding prior to his purchase.

== Stud record ==
In autumn of 1876, former Governor Leland Stanford, who was just establishing his breeding farm in the Santa Clara Valley, visited Stony Ford to purchase stock, mainly broodmares. Electioneer was acquired by Stanford in 1877 for $12,000. He was brought to California, where he became the principal breeding stallion at the Palo Alto Stock Farm. Stanford initially made limited use of Electioneer as a breeding stallion because much of his existing stock descended from Hambletonian 10, and he wished to avoid closely related bloodlines. Electioneer's first crop of foals at Palo Alto in 1878 numbered at seven and included Fred Crocker. Electioneer produced yearlings that sold for as much as $50,000. The next crop numbered 21, while the 1880 crop numbered 16. That year, Fred Crocker, one of the seven foals sired by Electioneer in his first year gained attention with a time of 2:25¾, a two-year-old record. In 1881, his crop totaled 23. He had his largest crop in 1882 with 40 foals in one year. Electioneer was bred to two mares from Kentucky's Woodburn Farm in 1888, Miss Russell, the dam of Maud S., and her daughter Russia, a full sister to Maud S. Both mares produced foals the following spring.

By the end of his breeding career, he had produced more trotters capable of completing a mile in 2:20 or less than any other sire of his era. In 1890, Frank Leslie's Illustrated Newspaper credited Electioneer with 46 offspring holding records between 2:10½ and 2:30, including 13 that had trotted a mile in 2:20 or faster.

Among Electioneer's offspring was Sunol, a mare that achieved a mile of 2:08¼. Another son, Palo Alto, recorded 2:08¾. His son Arion, foaled in 1889, lowered the two-year-old trotting record for a high-wheel sulky to 2:10¾. Arion was sold to J. Malcolm Forbes for $125,000, a record price for a horse at the time.

== Death ==
Electioneer died at Palo Alto Farm on December 3, 1890. He passed away from a heart condition described at the time as rheumatism of the heart. His bones were placed in the Standford University Museum.

== Legacy ==
In 1955, he was inducted into the U.S. Harness Racing Hall of Fame in its Immortals category.

A bronze statue of Electioneer stands near the historic horse barn on the Stanford University campus, commemorating his association with the Palo Alto Stock Farm. The statue was unveiled at the Red Barn in October 1985. Donated by the family of L. W. Lane Jr., the sculpture was created by John Melish of Fairfax, California, using an 1880s lithograph of the stallion as a reference.

== Pedigree ==
Pedigree of Electioneer, bay horse, 1868
Sire Hambletonian 1849	Abdallah; 1823	Mambrino†	Messenger†
Sire Hambletonian 1849	Abdallah; 1823	Mambrino†	Sourcrout Mare†
Sire Hambletonian 1849	Abdallah; 1823	Amazzonia	Dove†
Sire Hambletonian 1849	Abdallah; 1823	Amazzonia	Fagdown
Sire Hambletonian 1849	Charles Kent Mare; 1834	Bellfounder	Old Bellfounder
Sire Hambletonian 1849	Charles Kent Mare; 1834	Bellfounder	Velocity
Sire Hambletonian 1849	Charles Kent Mare; 1834	One Eye	Bishop's Hambletonian†
Sire Hambletonian 1849	Charles Kent Mare; 1834	One Eye	Silvertail
Dam Green Mountain Maid 1862	Harry Clay; 1853	Cassius M. Clay Jr.	Cassius M. Clay
Dam Green Mountain Maid 1862	Harry Clay; 1853	Cassius M. Clay Jr.	Charles W. Mitchell Mare
Dam Green Mountain Maid 1862	Harry Clay; 1853	Fan	Bellfounder
Dam Green Mountain Maid 1862	Harry Clay; 1853	Fan	Mare by Royalist
Dam Green Mountain Maid 1862	Shanghai Mary; 1847	Irons Cadmus (unconfirmed)	Cadmus
Dam Green Mountain Maid 1862	Shanghai Mary; 1847	Irons Cadmus (unconfirmed)	Goldsmith Coffeen Mare
Dam Green Mountain Maid 1862	Shanghai Mary; 1847	Unidentified mare	Unknown
Dam Green Mountain Maid 1862	Shanghai Mary; 1847	Unidentified mare	Unknown

== See also ==
- Palo Alto Stock Farm

== Gallery ==
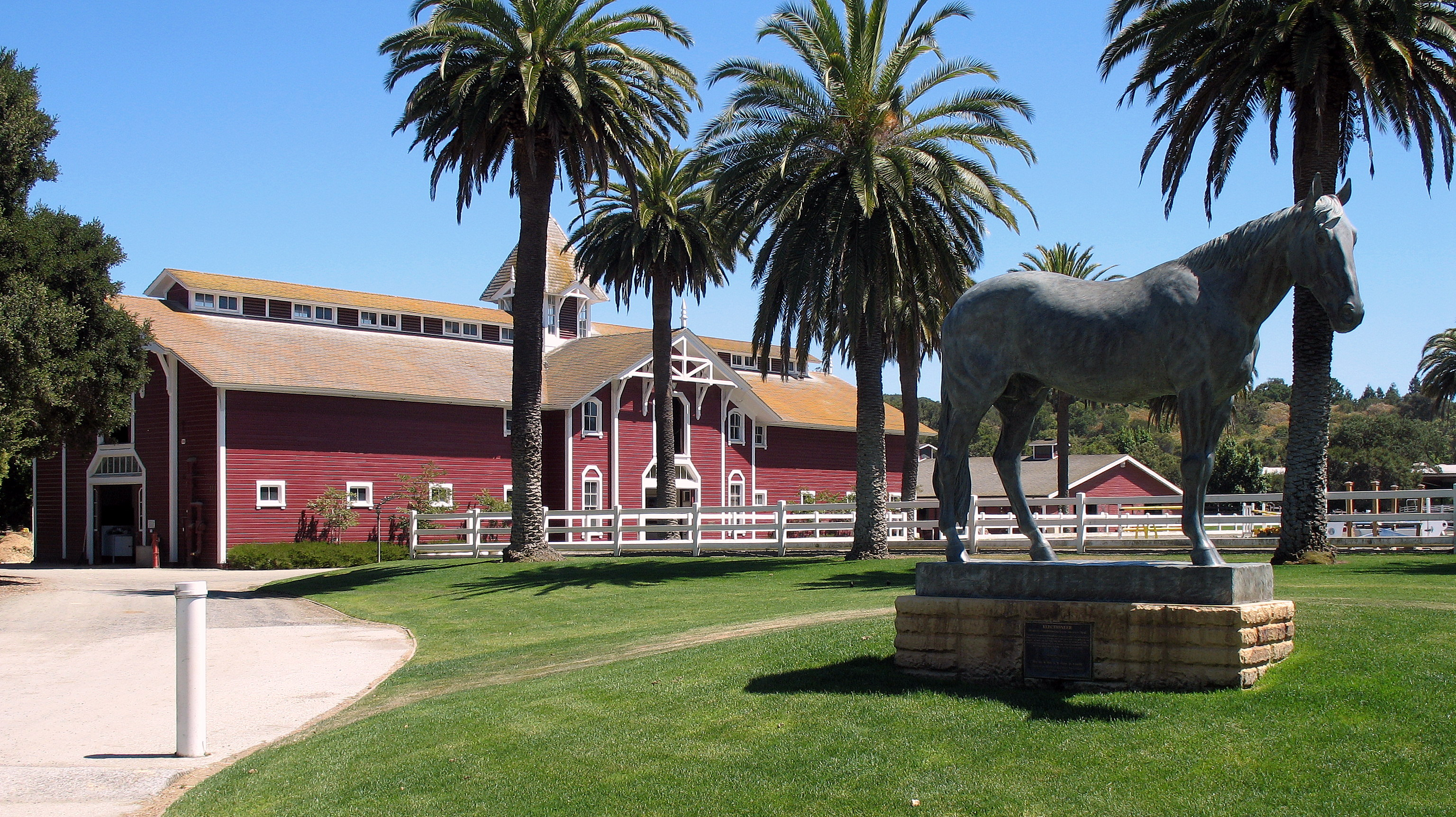
Bronze statue of Electioneer outside the historic Palo Alto Stock Farm barn

Electioneer's preserved ears, displayed at Stanford University's Cantor Arts Center
