= George M. Patchen (horse) =

American-bred Standardbred racehorse (1849 – 1864)

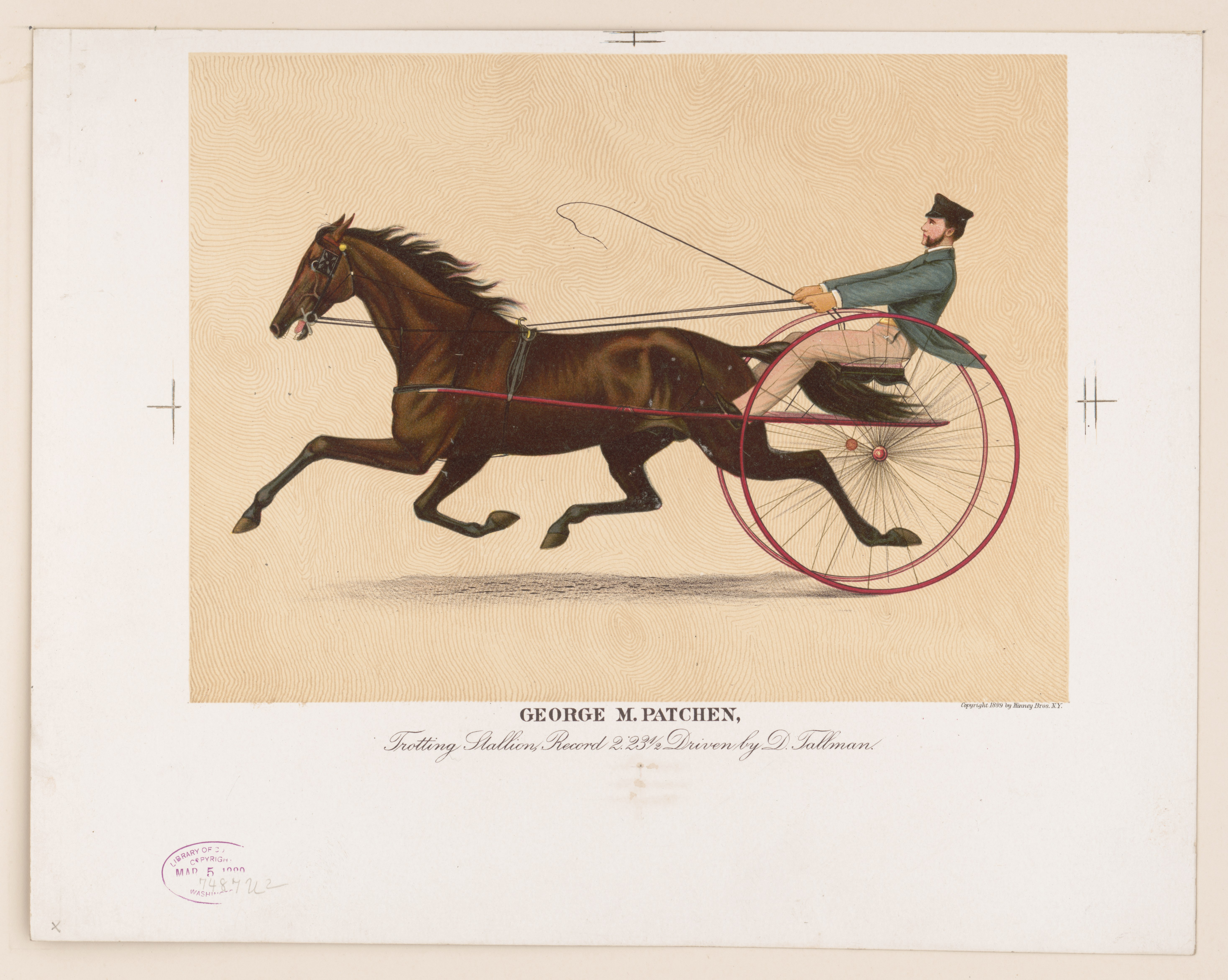
- Breed: Standardbred
- Sire: Cassius M. Clay
- Grandsire: Henry Clay
- Dam: Unidentified
- Damsire: Head'em
- Sex: Stallion
- Foaled: May 1849
- Died: May 1, 1864
- Country: United States
- Colour: Bay
- Breeder: H. J. Sickles
- Record: 2:23½

George M. Patchen (May 1849 – May 1, 1864) was an American trotting horse who went on to become a world trotting champion and a famed sire.

== Origin and early years ==
George M. Patchen was foaled in May 1849 on the Sickles stud farm in Pleasant Valley, Monmouth County, New Jersey. He was named after a Brooklyn newspaper executive and sportsman, George M. Patchen. G. M. Patchen owned the trotting stallion Cassius M. Clay of the Clay Trotting Horses.

George M. Patchen was sired by Cassius M. Clay. His dam was an unidentified mare by Head'em, a son of the thoroughbred imported Trustee. The mare belonged to Richard Carman of Westchester County, New York. After Carman entrusted the mare to Patchen, and Patchen realized he couldn't care for her, he arranged for H. J. Sickles in Monmouth County to take her, with Cassius M. Clay standing at stud in 1848. She wintered at the Sickles farm.

George M. Patchen was a bay stallion of notable strength, standing 16 hands (64 inches, 163 cm).

== Racing career ==
In the early 1850s, when he was just two or three, he was bought for $400 by John Buckley of Bordentown, New Jersey, from H. J. Sickles. As a trainer, John Buckley handled American Eclipse. A few months after the deal, George M. Patchen's ownership was split when Dr. Longstreet of Bordentown bought a half share.

George M. Patchen wasn't put to the track until he was nearly six years old. Until his trotting debut in October 1858, he was seen only at agricultural shows and stood at Bordentown, New Jersey, except during the 1857 season.

He won his first race in 1854 with a time of 2:41. He won the 1855 U.S. Agricultural Society Show in Philadelphia and the 1856 New Jersey Agricultural Show, defeating John Nelson, Hero, and others in 2:40. During the late 1850s, John Buckley conditioned him on Equestrian Park's one‐mile course, located on Sandtown Road a mile from Trenton, New Jersey. In 1857, he made a season at Newton, beating Morning Star and Woful to a wagon in 2:38 and 2:33. Following his spring season at Bordentown, he won in Somerville in fall 1858 with mile heats to a wagon in 2:29. That autumn, Buckley also rode him bareback at Bordentown in 2:31, though he lost badly to Ethan Allen after breaking in the first heat at 2:23.

In October 1858, Buckley sold his interest to Joseph Hall of Rochester, New York, and although Longstreet remained co‑owner, Hall took full charge of the horse's training and campaigns.

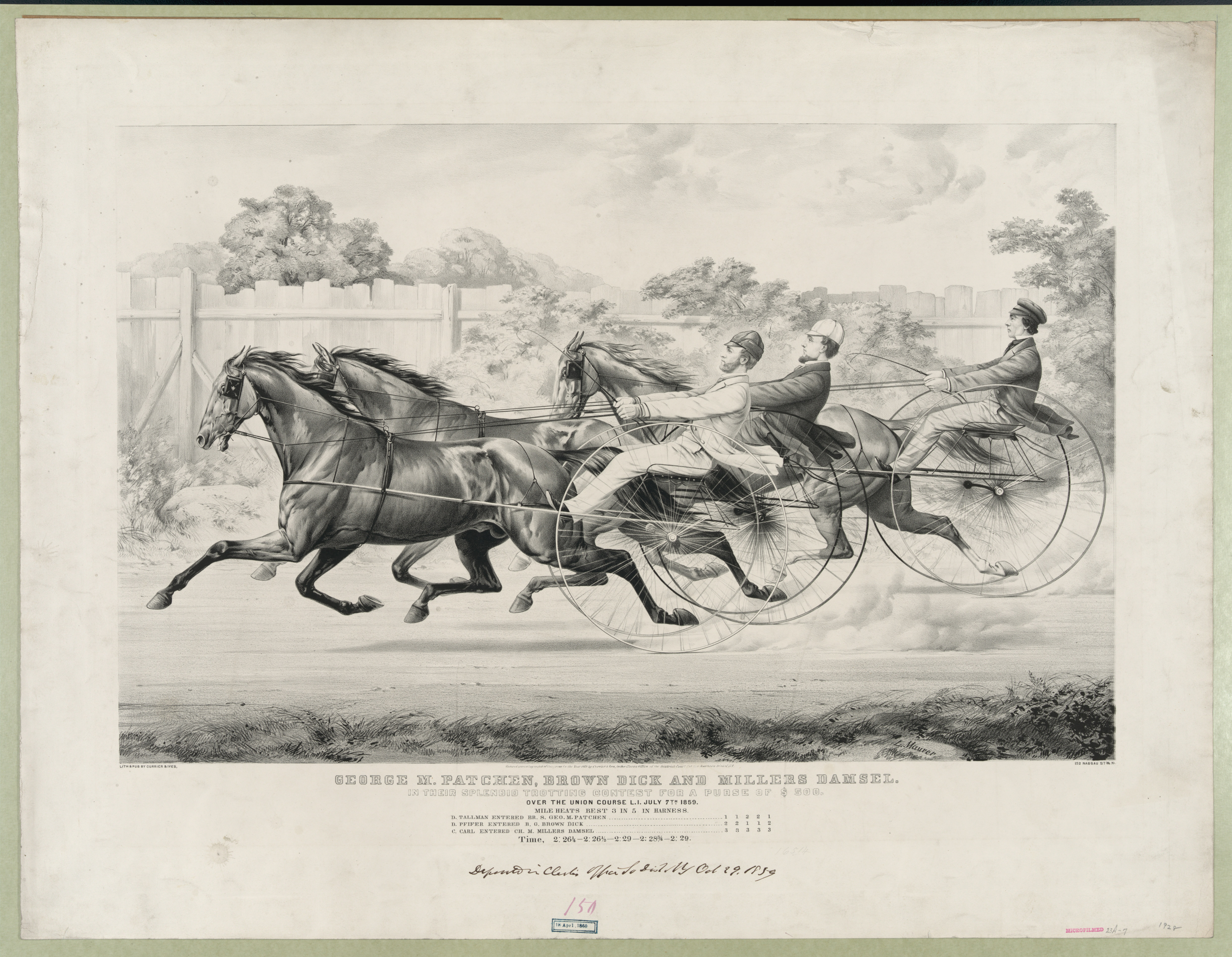
George M. Patchen, Brown Dick, and Millers Dansel, Union Course, L.I., July 7, 1859

In 1859, he won eight races, defeating noted trotters like Lancet and lowering his record to 2:25¼. Patchen held the record for the fastest mile from 1859 through 1868.

George M. Patchen, Brown Dick, and Miller's Damsel competed in a trotting race for a $500 purse at Union Course, Long Island, on July 7, 1859. The race was commemorated in a lithograph by Currier & Ives. Sporting men and horse enthusiasts eagerly watched as George M. Patchen met Ethan Allen in 1860 at Union Course for a $2,000 harness race, best three out of five heats. During that season, he twice beat Ethan Allen (2:25½) and Flora Temple (2:19¾), though she bested him nine times that season. In one of their matches at the Union Course, he won a heat in 2:23½—the fastest mile ever by a trotting stallion at the time. Before his second two-mile heat in harness at Philadelphia's Suffolk Park in 1860, George M. Patchen was sold. The buyer was William Waltermire, a New York cattleman, who paid $20,000 to Joseph Hall.

The trotter competed until 1861, took a break through 1862, and came back in 1863 for six races. At age 14 in 1863, George M. Patchen set a world record for trotting under saddle, completing two miles in 4:56.

== Stud record ==
At just three years old, he began his stud career, remaining a stallion from 1852 to 1858.

After a racing career, George M. Patchen was retired to stud by the mid-1860s and became a renowned stallion. Among his progeny, four achieved standard trotting records, led by Lucy with a best of 2:18¼. He also sired fourteen sons who collectively produced sixty-one trotters and two pacers in standard time, and four daughters who produced four trotters and one pacer.

His top sires were Seneca Patchen, George M. Patchen, Jr. (2:27), and Godfrey Patchen. Godfrey with nine trotters, Henry B. with seven, Seneca with sixteen trotters and one pacer, Wild Wagoner with four, and Tom with three.

== Death ==
George M. Patchen died on May 1, 1864. His death was from a rupture suffered at John I. Snedeker's stud farm in Long Island.

== Legacy ==
One of the era's finest trotters, George M. Patchen became the most celebrated member of the Clay family line and founded the Patchen family legacy.

Charles Spencer Humphreys, a celebrated animal painter of Camden, painted an oil painting of the racehorse in 1857.

He campaigned for four seasons in 1857, 1859, 1860, and 1863; he won 20 races and earned respect for his determination, particularly in his many contests with world record-setter Flora Temple. In 1860, George M. Patchen lowered the world's champion trotting stallion record to 2:23½ at the Union Course. As Hiram Woodruff wrote in Trotting Horse of America: "There had not been another horse that had been so close to Flora Temple herself in speed, in ability to stay a distance, and in apparent endurance and capacity to keep at it race after race as George M. Patchen. He beat her more heats than any other horse, and most of the heats in which she beat him were very fast and close. He met her, too, at the golden prime of her life, when she had just reached the full maturity of her extraordinary power."

In the early 1900s, the Freehold Raceway was called the George M. Patchen Track. The first "George M. Patchen Trot," a $5,000 annual horse race, was held at the Freehold Raceway in 1971. It was named after the horse to honor the most famous harness horse ever foaled in Pleasant Valley.

== See also ==
- List of racehorses
