= Hambletonian 10 =

Standardbred foundation sire

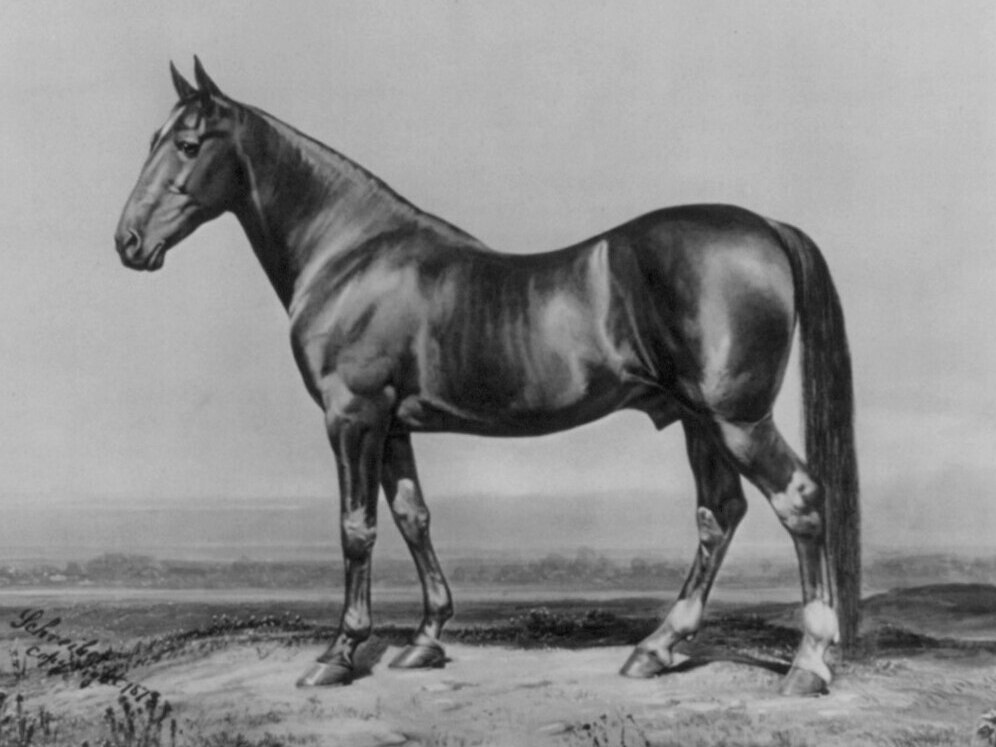
- Photogravure from 1892
- Breed: Standardbred
- Gait: Trot
- Mile record: 2:48 1/2
- Sire: Abdallah
- Grandsire: Mambrino
- Dam: Charles Kent Mare
- Damsire: Bellfounder
- Sex: Stallion
- Foaled: 1849
- Died: 1876
- Country: United States
- Color: Bay
- Breeder: Jonas Seely, Jr.
- Owner: William Rysdyk

Honors
- Hambletonian Stakes; Harness Racing Hall of Fame Immortal (1953)

Hambletonian 10, or Rysdyk's Hambletonian (May 5, 1849 – March 27, 1876), was an American trotter and a founding sire of the Standardbred horse breed. The stallion was born in Sugar Loaf, New York, on 5 May 1849. Hambletonian has been inducted into the Immortals category of the Harness Racing Hall of Fame.

== Origin and early years ==
Hambletonian 10 was bred by Jonas Seely, Jr., on his farm at Sugar Loaf in Orange County, New York. He was sired by Abdallah, a grandson of the hugely influential Thoroughbred sire, Messenger. Abdallah was ugly in body and temperament, so much so that he was sold to a fish peddler for $5. Hambletonian's dam was known as the Charles Kent mare or the "Kent Mare", sired by Bellfounder (GB), an imported Norfolk Trotter. Hambletonian was inbred to Messenger (GB) (1780) in the third, fourth, and fifth generations.

Seely's hired hand, William Rysdyk, cared for the mare and foal. Rysdyk became so attached to the pair and was so convinced that the foal would someday be great that he asked to purchase them. Seely finally agreed, and for $125, William Rysdyk took his prize possessions home.

Hambletonian had an unusual build, being low at the withers (15.1 hands), but high at the croup (15.3 hands). This length of hind leg provided a great deal of thrust with each stride, and he passed both characteristics on to all his get.

== Racing record ==
Hambletonian 10, from his Standard registered number, made his first public appearance at the age of 6 months at the nearby Orange County Fair in Goshen. He caused quite a sensation, and horsemen started referring to him as "Rysdyk's Abdallah colt." Meanwhile, another son of Abdallah, Abdallah Chief, owned by Seeley C. Roe, was looming as a competitor for the local stallion honors. Roe had nothing but contempt for Hambletonian, and claimed he would never be a trotter, only a show horse. This issue was settled in 1852 at Long Island's Union Course. Hambletonian and Abdallah Chief were hitched to skeleton wagons with their owners driving. Three minutes and three seconds after the start, Hambletonian crossed the finish line ahead of his rival. Roe still was not satisfied and insisted on another race. A time trial was held. Abdallah Chief went the mile in 2:55½. Then Roe watched Hambletonian, in what would be the only time trial of his career, trot the mile in 2:48½.

== Stud record ==
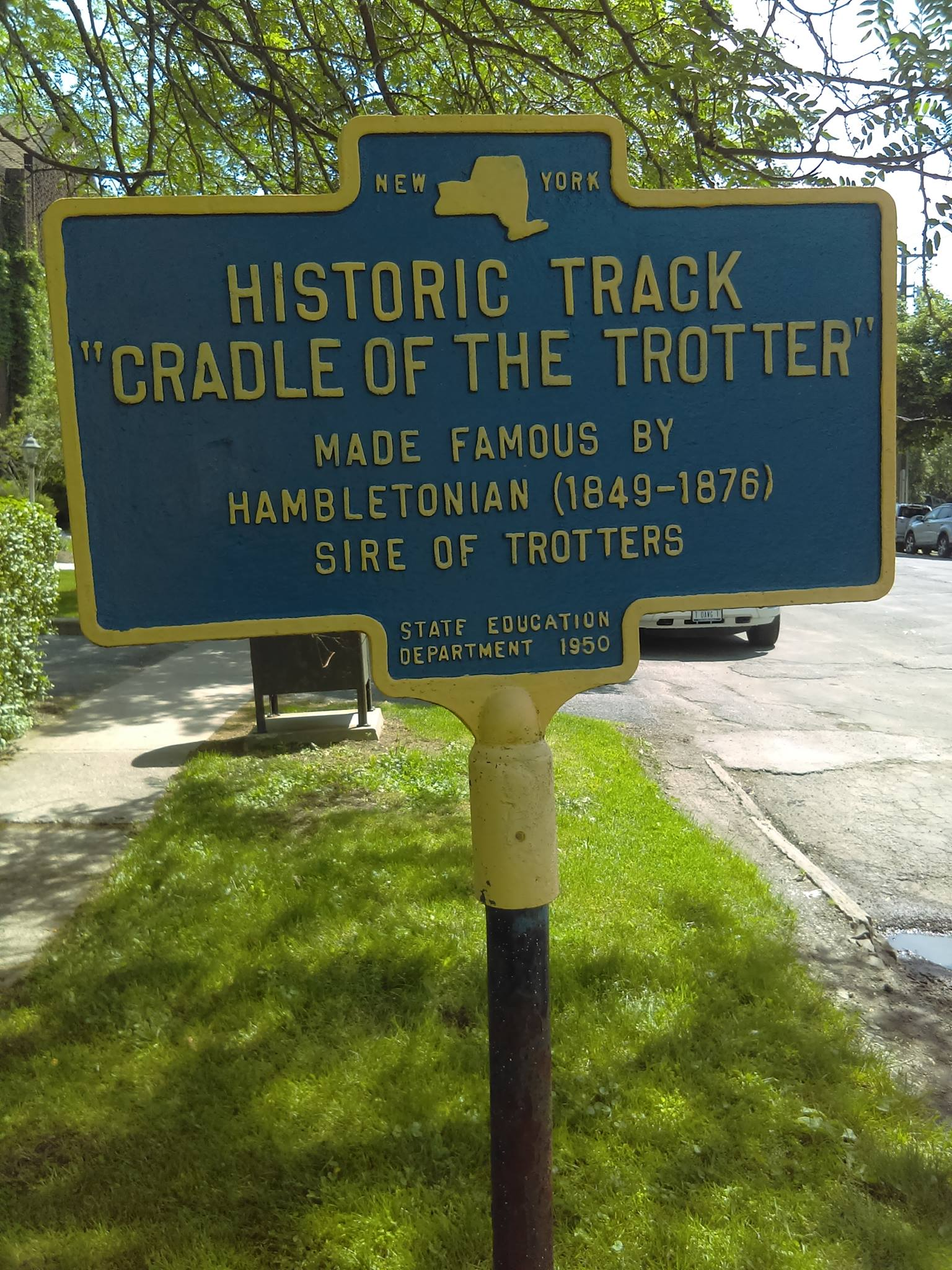
Plaque in Goshen, New York commemorating Hambletonian's success as a sire

Hambletonian 10 began his stud career at age two when Rysdyk allowed him to cover four mares. The horse's reputation as a speed sire quickly grew, and Rysdyk then placed Hambletonian at stud in Chester and bred him to mares for a fee upwards of $500, with Rysdyk making a modest fortune from the horse's services.

In the 1860s, one of the stallion's sons, Dexter, trotted the mile in 2:17¼; a record. Dexter was immediately bought for $25,000 by a Robert E. Bonner for his own private driving pleasure. A rigidly moral man, Bonner did not approve of racing or betting, so no one would ever know if Dexter could have trotted even faster. Ever since, though, no horses lacking lines to Hambletonian 10 in their pedigree have ever done better.

In 24 seasons at stud, between 1851 and 1875, Hambletonian produced about 1,335 foals. Through four of Hambletonian's sons (George Wilkes, Dictator, Happy Medium, and Electioneer), the lineage of virtually all North American Standardbred horses can be traced to him.

== Sire line tree ==
Hambletonian 10 Sire line descent tree
- Hambletonian 10
  - Abdallah
    - Major Edsall
      - Robert McGregor
        - Cresceus
  - Shark
  - Major Winfield
  - George Wilkes
    - Red Wilkes
      - Ashland Wilkes
        - John R Gentry
    - Onward
      - Allandorf
        - Black Allan
      - Anderson Wilkes
        - Single G
    - Alcyone
      - McKinney
        - Zombro
        - Belwin
    - Patchen Wilkes
      - Joe Patchen
        - Dan Patch
    - William L
      - Axtell
        - Axworthy
  - Volunteer
    - Bodine
    - Gloster
    - Driver
    - Powers
    - Alley
    - St Julien
    - Domestic
  - Hambletonian Second
  - Dexter
  - Dictator
    - Director
      - Direct
        - Directly
        - Directum Kelly
        - Direct Hal
          - Walter Direct
            - Napoleon Direct
              - Billy Direct
                - Ensign Hanover
                  - Ensign Lad
                    - Rambling Fury
                      - Rambling Willie
                - Tar Heel
      - Directum
    - Jay Eye See
  - Happy Medium
    - Pilot Medium
      - Peter The Great
        - Peter Scott
        - Peter Volo
        - Peter The Brewer
        - The Laurel Hall
  - Electioneer
    - Palo Alto
    - Chimes
      - The Abbott
      - The Monk
      - The Abbe
        - Abbedale
          - Hal Dale
            - Adios
            - Good Time
              - Fast Clip
            - Dale Frost
              - Meadow Skipper
        - Bert Abbe
    - May King
      - Bingen
        - Todd
        - Uhlan
        - J Malcolm Forbes
    - Arion

== Death ==
Hambletonian monument in Chester, on Hambletonian Avenue just northwest of Oakland Avenue

At age 27 on March 27, 1876, Hambletonian died. Both his owner, who had died in 1870, and he were buried in Chester, New York. Seventeen years after Hambletonian's death, a granite monument, the gift of many people who had fond memories of the horse, was placed over his grave on Hambletonian Avenue. William Rysdyk is buried in the Community Cemetery on the Old Seely Ward Farm in Chester, New York.

== Honors ==
The Hambletonian Stakes race, the most prestigious harness race for trotters in North America, is named in honor of Hambletonian 10.

The official mascot of the Chester Academy (formerly Chester Jr/Sr High School) in Chester, where Hambletonian is buried, is Hambletonian. High-school sports teams are referred to as the Chester Hambletonians, and Hambletonian's image appears frequently throughout the village of Chester. The road where Hambletonian is buried is also named Hambletonian Avenue.

== Pedigree ==
Hambletonian 10 is considered a foundation sire of the Standardbred due to his pervasive influence on modern bloodlines. The breed is older than Hambletonian by a few generations, though, and was formed by mixing Thoroughbred bloodlines with various trotting breeds, such as the Norfolk Trotter, Canadian Pacer, and Hackney Horse. Hambletonian's sire Abdallah, one of the fastest trotters of his time, was sired by the Thoroughbred stallion Mambrino and was out of the Norfolk Trotter mare Amazzona.

Pedigree of Hambletonian, bay horse, 1849
Sire Abdallah 1823	Mambrino†; 1806	Messenger*†	Mambrino†
Sire Abdallah 1823	Mambrino†; 1806	Messenger*†	Turf Mare†
Sire Abdallah 1823	Mambrino†; 1806	Sourcrout Mare†	Sourcrout†
Sire Abdallah 1823	Mambrino†; 1806	Sourcrout Mare†	Whirligigg Mare†
Sire Abdallah 1823	Amazzonia‡ 1810	Dove†	Saratoga†^
Sire Abdallah 1823	Amazzonia‡ 1810	Dove†	Expedition Mare†
Sire Abdallah 1823	Amazzonia‡ 1810	Fasdown	Messenger*†
Sire Abdallah 1823	Amazzonia‡ 1810	Fasdown	unknown
Dam Charles Kent Mare 1834	Bellfounder‡ 1816	Old Bellfounder§	Pretender - Wroots§
Dam Charles Kent Mare 1834	Bellfounder‡ 1816	Old Bellfounder§	Smuggler Mare§
Dam Charles Kent Mare 1834	Bellfounder‡ 1816	Velocity‡	Haphazard†
Dam Charles Kent Mare 1834	Bellfounder‡ 1816	Velocity‡	unknown
Dam Charles Kent Mare 1834	One Eye; 1815	Bishop's Hambletonian†	Messenger*†
Dam Charles Kent Mare 1834	One Eye; 1815	Bishop's Hambletonian†	Pheasant†
Dam Charles Kent Mare 1834	One Eye; 1815	Silvertail	Messenger*†
Dam Charles Kent Mare 1834	One Eye; 1815	Silvertail	Black Jin (breeding unknown)

*^ Hambletonian 10 is inbred 3S × 5S x 4S x 4D x 4D to the stallion Messenger, meaning that he appears third generation, fifth generation (via Saratoga)^, and fourth generation, once each, on the sire side of his pedigree, and fourth generation twice on the dam side of his pedigree.

† Thoroughbred
‡ Norfolk Trotter
§ Hackney

== See also ==
- List of racehorses
