= Rush Park =

Former horse racing course in Independence, Iowa

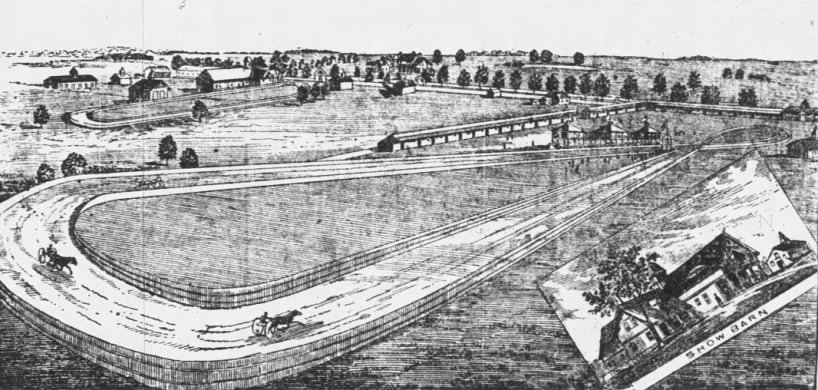
- Location: Independence, Iowa, U.S.
- Owned by: Charles W. Williams (1886-1894); Independence Driving Club (1894-1900s)
- Date opened: August 25, 1890
- Course type: Harness racing

Rush Park was a harness racing track in Independence, Iowa.

== History ==
In the late 1880s and early 1890s, Independence, Iowa, became known as a harness racing capital. Charles W. Williams, who had operated a dairy farm before breeding record-breaking horses Allerton and Axtell, purchased the 40-acre Buchanan County fairgrounds west of Independence in 1886. He bought it from Col. Jed Lake and renamed it Rush Park for Lake's son, Rush C. Lake. Rush Park, once a wet meadow and pasture, was drained and prepared for construction of buildings and stables. Rush Park was outfitted with a new grandstand and modern stables for Williams's prized horses.

On the fairgrounds' half-mile track, Williams's trotter Axtell broke the world two-year-old trotting record in 1888, then set a new three-year-old record of 2:12 on October 11, 1889. Following the new record, Williams sold Axtell to a syndicate in Terre Haute, Indiana, for a record $105,000.

Using the proceeds, he bought 120 acres east of the fairgrounds, expanding Rush Park to 300 acres. Williams soon added the 8,732-square-foot Rush Park Show Barn and planned a novel one-mile race track. Construction of the new track started in spring 1890 and finished by mid-June. Installed on the grounds was a revolutionary kite-shaped track, designed by a Cleveland man and shaped like a base-heavy figure eight. The design reduced turns to one and lengthened the straightaways, improving horses' speed. Running north–south with a loop at the north, the track was 75 feet wide on the straight sections and 60 feet at the turn, fitting ten horses side by side. The straightaways were 1,574.743 feet each, and the turn was 2,130.514 feet. The track, constructed on swampy ground, had a peat soil foundation. It was covered with five or six inches of black, spongy soil that provided a firm, fast, and springy surface. The innovative kite-shaped mile track that replaced the quarter-mile track was described as pliable rather than hard and easy on the horses. The first full circuit of the kite track, on June 17, 1890, demonstrated its impressive speed.

On August 25, 1890, over 225 horses worth more than a million dollars and thousands of attendees gathered at Rush Park for the kite track's grand opening. Admission was $1 at the gate, with season tickets for all five days priced at $4, or $7 for two. Although rain spoiled day one, 10,000 attended the next day. Roy Wilkes set a world record of 2:08¼. The successful meet spread news of the kite track quickly. Racing authorities came from far and wide in October.

The American Trotter, a nationally-known racing magazine, reported that half of the ten best records broken in 1890 were set at Rush Park's kite track. This included Allerton's four-year-old stallion record of 2:13.5 set at Rush Park.

Between 1890 and 1892, the races at Rush Park Race Track became a major attraction for Independence. It became known in racing circles as the "Lexington of the North." The well-maintained track made Rush Park a preferred training ground. Hundreds of drivers and stable hands came for the big meets, always paying cash for hay and grain locally.

Rush Park, in 1891, housed thirty mares, as well as the stallions Patronage, the brother of Patron (2:14¼) and Judge Rider (2:28¼), by Billy Wilkes, alongside Allerton and Barnhart. The proprietor trained his own colts. Allerton was worked in spring and summer and then driven in the fall to beat his record. Rush Park hosted three race meetings, held in July, August, and October. The 1891 season opened on July 1 with a meet running through July 4, featuring perfect track conditions, fair weather, and a crowd of roughly 2,500. In August 1891, Rush Park offered $90,000 in stakes and purses, the largest ever by a trotting track, and expectations were that it would be the greatest meeting ever held. Held from August 24 to 29, the meeting drew immense crowds, offered great prizes, and featured the fastest three heats ever trotted in a race by Nancy Hanks. The race was between Nancy Hanks, Allerton, and Margaret S. for the championship of five-year-old trotters. The August meet at Rush Park sold 500 tickets in Dubuque alone.

By the end of the 1891 season, Rush Park was recognized as the "fastest track on earth," producing many personal bests for horses. Allerton set a record of 2:09¼, and in 1892, Nancy Hanks trotted a mile in 2:05. Charles W. Williams was widely praised for his expertly managed racing events.

Rush Park had established itself as the state's leading track, with hundreds of horses trained yearly and numerous records made on the kite track. In spring 1892, the proprietor of Rush Park invested $10,000 in the corner of Chatham and Mott streets for a planned 73-room brick hotel and an 825-seat opera house. By June 1892, a new $15,000 grandstand seating 10,000 was being built on the track's eastern side, an electric street railway was under construction, and the $40,000 hotel was in progress. The Gedney Hotel, three stories tall, opened on August 21, 1892. The hotel featured amenities designed to accommodate sportsmen visiting Independence. To shuttle guests from the hotel to the races, Williams built a $40,000 electric trolley. Also that year, he constructed an elaborate home on 10 acres northwest of Rush Park, perched on a hill with a view of the racetrack.

Over $100,000 in purses were arranged for Rush Park's races of August 1892, with the highlight being the $10,000 race between Axtell and Allerton.

By late 1892 to 1893, bicycle racing surged in popularity with the pneumatic bicycle tire, turning Rush Park into a frequent cycling track.

The widespread adoption of the small-wheeled sulky and other setbacks soon ended the local era of high-stakes harness racing. The kite-shaped track lost its competitive advantage due to the bicycle sulky's invention. When the financial panic of 1893 hit, it ruined countless fortunes, and Williams, owner of the track, was caught in the collapse. He was forced to turn over real estate valued at $250,000 to satisfy debts of $100,000. Even with local support to keep his farm and racetrack going, Williams decided to transfer Rush Park to creditors to cover his debts. He accepted an opportunity to oversee a track and breeding center in Galesburg, Illinois. Williams moved to Illinois from Independence in the summer of 1894, bringing fifty-four horses aboard multiple cars.

To prevent the end of racing after C. W. Williams left, 100 citizens established the Independence Driving Club with $10,000 capital and leased the kite track. The new management lowered the admission fee to 50 cents, which included a seat in the grandstand. In 1898, the free gate system was adopted to attract crowds, but by 1899, entries fell short despite $40,000 stakes, leading to the decision not to hold a meet. The track ran its last racing meet in August 1904.

== Closure ==
The several years of management under the Independence Driving Club couldn't restore Rush Park's former glory. By 1905, the grandstand was turned into a barn. Used for training until 1906, the once-famous Rush Park track then closed and became pasture for grazing cattle.

== See also ==
- Axtell
