= Axworthy (horse) =

American Standardbred sire

Axworthy (1892–1917) was an American Standardbred horse. A descendant of Hambletonian 10, he is considered one of the most important sires in the development of the modern Standardbred breed.

== History ==
Axworthy 24845 structure chart notation pedigree

Axworthy created a bloodline in the making of the American Standardbred through the Hambletonian 10 offspring George Wilkes. Axworthy was bred by A B Darling, New York at the stud at Terre Haute, Indiana at the stock farm of W P Ijams. He was developed first by Budd Doble at Terre Haute and when three-years-old by John Young, Kentucky. In 1896 Axworthy was bought by John H Shults, Brooklyn, New York at an auction in Madison Square Garden, New York. From there he was sent to Parkville Farms. Ones more in the sale ring 1906 he was sold to William Simpson and sent to Lexington, Kentucky.

Axworthy was a tall studhorse of impressive conformation, with a grand slashing stroke. He was of a light chestnut color. Gait and early speed was transmitted to his offspring.

Tail-male pedigree: Axtell - William L. - George Wilkes - Hambletonian.
Tail-female pedigree: Marguerite by Kentucky Prince - Young Daisy by Strideaway - Daisy.

== Sire line tree ==
Axworthy Sire line descent tree
- Axworthy
  - Guy Axworthy
    - Guy Abbey
      - Greyhound
