= Axtell (horse) =

American-bred Standardbred racehorse

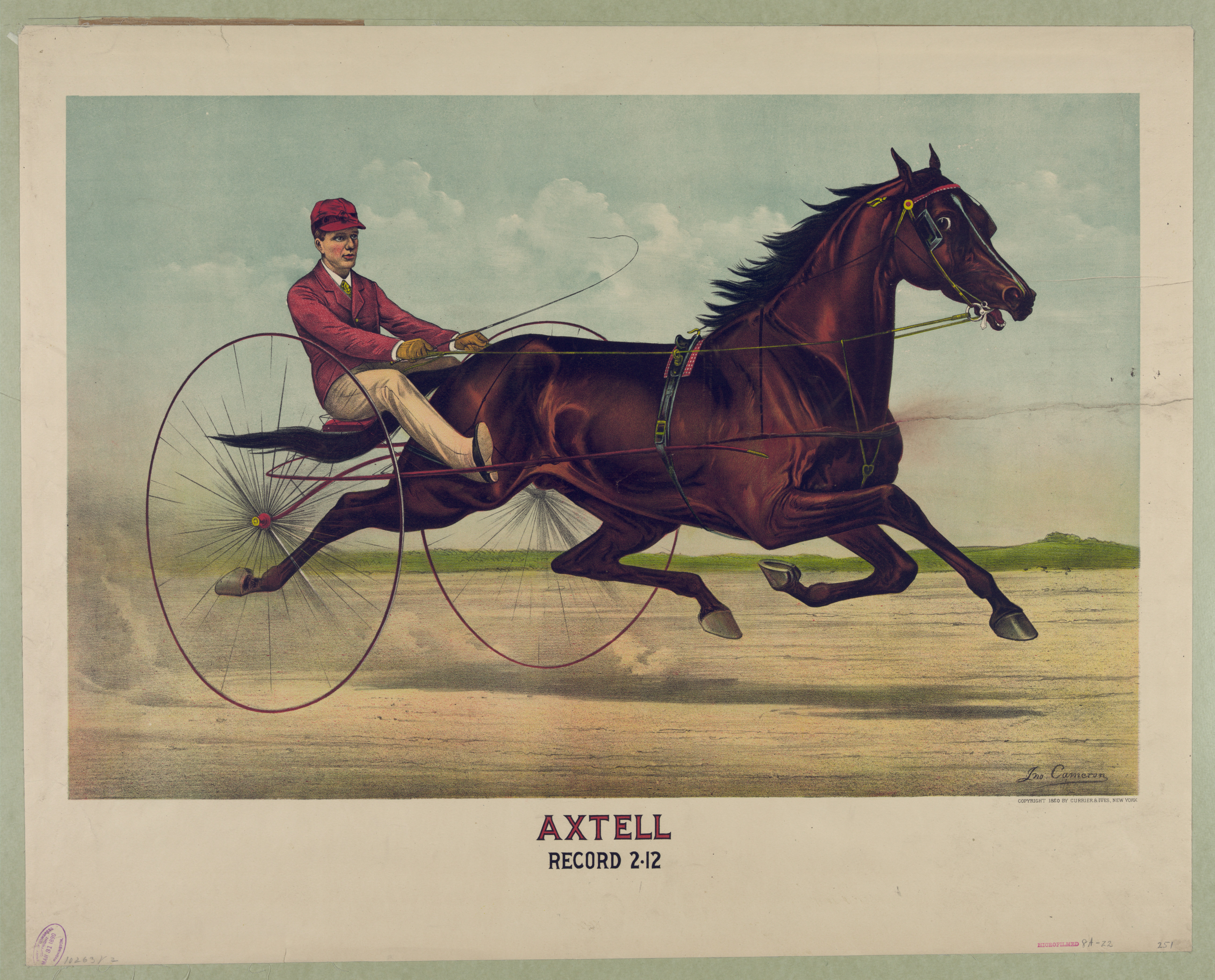
- Breed: Standardbred
- Sire: William L.
- Grandsire: George Wilkes
- Dam: Lou
- Damsire: Mambrino Boy
- Sex: Stallion
- Foaled: March 31, 1886
- Died: August 19, 1906
- Country: United States
- Colour: Bay
- Breeder: Charles W. Williams
- Record: 2:12

Honours
- United States Harness Racing Hall of Fame (1955)

Axtell (March 31, 1886 – August 19, 1906) was an American trotting horse. He was sold in 1889 for what was then the highest price ever paid for a trotting horse.

== Origin and early years ==
Axtell was bred by Charles W. Williams of Independence, Iowa. He was foaled on March 31, 1886. Axtell's sire was William L., by George Wilkes, a son of Hambletonian 10, the founder of the American trotting horse line. His dam, known as Lou, was sired by Mambrino Boy.

== Racing career ==
Iowa's Axtell was trained and raced by C. W. Williams at Rush Park, which was then a half-mile race track in Independence. His speed as a two-year-old wasn't clear at first, and by spring 1888, Williams had advertised him at $300—but no one bought him.

It wasn't until May 26, 1888, that Axtell was hitched to a sulky. During the fall of 1888, Axtell and Allerton launched their harness racing careers at Keokuk, Iowa. In the three-year-old trotter class, his debut was for a $100 purse on the Keokuk track against strong competition. The spirited two-year-old Axtell, with less than forty sulky outings, astonished spectators by defeating experienced three-year-olds. During the remainder of 1888, Axtell appeared at Independence, Cedar Rapids, and Lexington. He won silver cups competing in the Kentucky races. Axtell finished the 1888 season with a 2:23 two‑year‑old stallion time.

By the next year, Axtell was breaking records across major tracks and met Allerton only once, at Independence's Buchanan County Fair in 1889. On July 2, 1889, he set a new record for three-year-olds with a 2:15½ mile. He outpaced Sable Wilkes's previous benchmark. Shortly after, Robert E. Bonner offered $65,000 for Axtell, but the offer was declined. As a three-year-old, Axtell again won every start. On October 11, 1889, Axtell set the world's trotting record for stallions of any age at 2:12 in Terre Haute, Indiana. He was the first three-year-old ever to hold the world record.

On the following evening, history was made when Axtell was sold to a syndicate for $105,000, the highest price ever paid for a horse of any kind at that time. The syndicate was headed by Col. John W. Conley and included reinsman Budd Doble. With money from Axtell's sale, Williams purchased enough land in Iowa to build America's first kite track. Axtell never appeared in another race or exhibition after his sale to the syndicate.

== Stud record ==
After being purchased, Axtell was retired to stud. Among his progeny was the foundation sire Axworthy (2:15½). By 1891, he ranked among the highest-priced sires, with a stud fee of $1,000. Less than three years after his purchase, the stallion had already paid for himself. During his seventeen years at stud, Axtell reportedly generated nearly half a million dollars in fees.

In November 1900, the renowned sire was sold in auction at the Madison Square Garden by the Fasig-Tipton Company. He was purchased by G. H. Barlow of Binghamton, New York, for $14,700.

== Death ==
Axtell died on August 19, 1906, in Terre Haute, Indiana, United States. After dying of spasmodic colic, he was buried at the doorway of the Warren Park stable, property of W. P. Ijams, president of the American Trotting Association.

== Legacy ==
Axtell became one of the greatest sires in history, passing his speed to countless descendants. His fame endured in Independence, Iowa, where his image appeared everywhere and his name was used for products like Axtell soup, shirts, underwear, cigars, an Axtell laundry, and even a bank.

Axtell was inducted into the Harness Racing Museum & Hall of Fame in 1955.

== Gallery ==
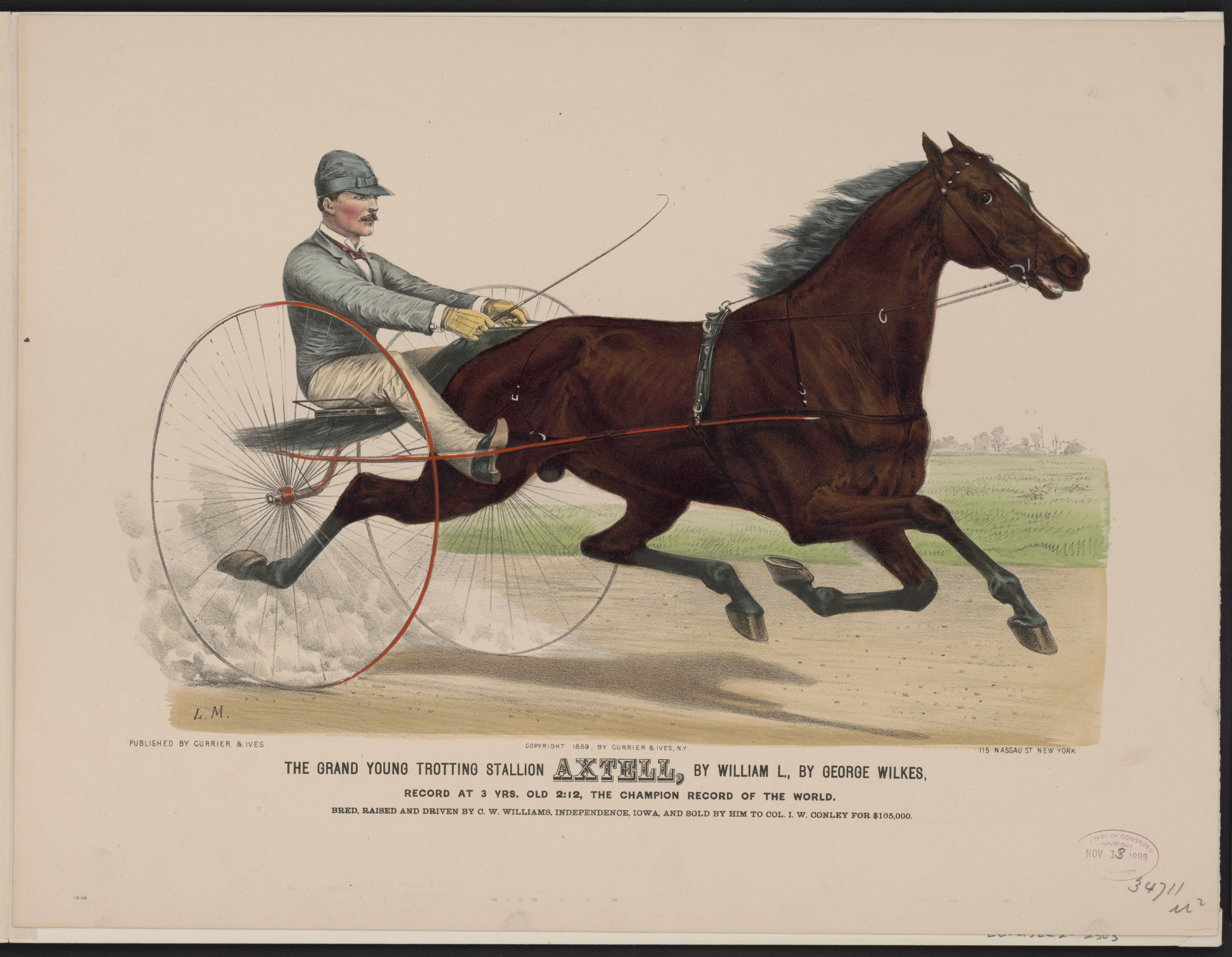
The trotting stallion Axtell, by William L. (by George Wilkes), 1889, Currier & Ives

== See also ==
- List of racehorses
