= Pleasant Valley, Monmouth County, New Jersey =

Populated place in Monmouth County, New Jersey, US

Pleasant Valley, New Jersey
- Unincorporated community
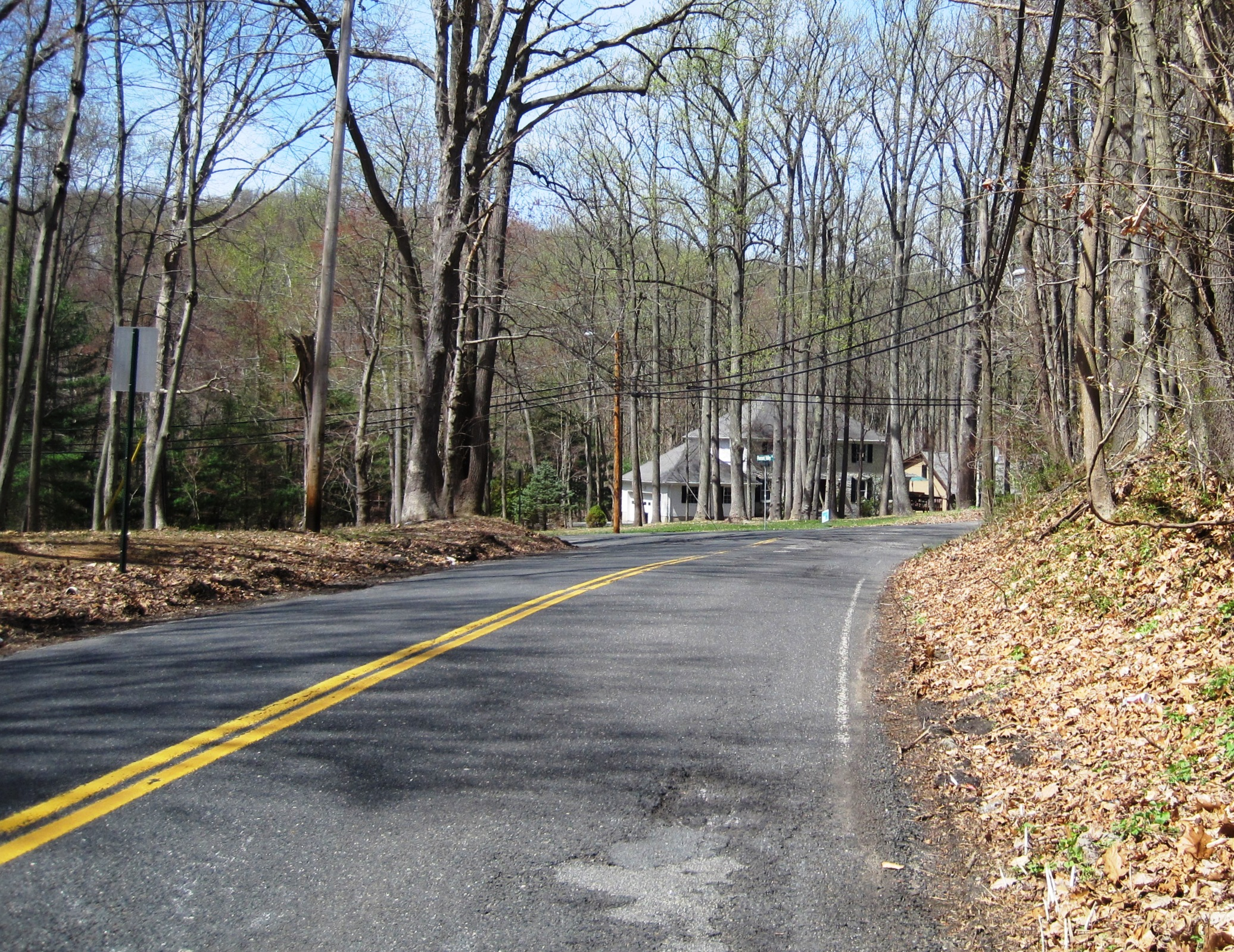
- Intersection of Pleasant Valley Road and Reids Hill Road

- Location of Pleasant Valley in Monmouth County. Inset: Location of county within the state of New Jersey Pleasant Valley (New Jersey) Pleasant Valley (the United States)
- Coordinates: 40°22′00″N 74°12′47″W
- Country: United States
- State: New Jersey
- County: Monmouth
- Township: Marlboro
- Elevation: 197 ft (60 m)
- GNIS feature ID: 879364

Pleasant Valley is an unincorporated community located within Marlboro Township in Monmouth County, in the U.S. state of New Jersey. The area reportedly received its name from George Washington after he went through the area in 1777. The area is hilly and forested and is dotted by medium to large-sized residences. Pleasant Valley Road and Reids Hill Road are main roads that pass through the area connecting to Routes 34, 79, and 520. A large part of land which makes up Pleasant Valley was originally granted by the King of England in 1665 to the Rev. Obadiah Holmes. In 1690, the area was settled by people of Dutch heritage and the original dominant language in the area was Low Dutch.

== Farming and hunting history ==
Largely starting as a farming community; Apples and a type of potato called "giant" were a common crop for the area (a giant potato is roughly about the size and shape of an American football). In 1916, the area "broke all records, harvesting 100 barrels of potatoes per acre. The area was also known for horse farms in the 1800s. One famous trotter came from this area. In 1849, George M. Patchen was foaled. He stood 16 hands high. He was bred by HF Sickles and in 1860 trotted a record 2:23.5 at Union Course, NY. Colonel Baker reported using this horse during the 1862 Second Manassas Campaign of the 1st DC Cav.

In the 1950s, the area was known for pheasant hunting. This was largely due to the Pleasant Valley Game Protective Association action to release 500 pheasants in the area, the day before hunting season started. The practice went on till 1960.

== Revolutionary War ==
The scene of armed conflict during the Revolutionary War, there were skirmishes between patriot forces and the Tories and Pine Robbers; reports of British foraging in this area and taking hogs, cattle and sheep back to New York were common. In 1778, an attack on the farm of Daniel P. Schenck resulted in his death. After breaking off the attach and leaving, his wife pursued the Tories and Pine Robbers and killed one of the attackers. Another documented revolutionary war fight happened on June 21, 1781 in this area. The evidence of this fighting after the war was documented in the pension of Walter Hier. He received 16 shilling, 8 pence a month for receiving a wound to his right arm "by a sword or cutlass" during hand-to-hand fighting at Pleasant Valley. A four-pound cannon was placed on a farm in the area as a signal gun. When fired, the enemy was near and the local patriots would know to rally at a local farm.

== School ==
- The area had one school called "The Pleasant Valley School". The school had one teacher who was teaching 1-8th grades. The teacher was required to "act at the school as a combined principal, teacher, janitor and children's nurse." Now demolished, the school house was located on the corner of Pleasant Valley Road and Reids Hill Road.
- Collier High School is located in Pleasant Valley. It is an alternative high school for children with special needs.

== Historic property ==
- Built by Col. Asher Holmes, Old Kentuck is currently listed on the National Register of Historic Places. Extensively remodeled in the 1940s the property is currently in a state of significant decay.
- Before getting to route 34, in the northeast corner of Pleasant Valley Road is an old Dutch Colonial house. This residence was constructed circa 1700. "It is perhaps the finest example of early Dutch architecture in Monmouth County".
- In 1967, the following properties were identified as historic locations in Pleasant Valley by the New Jersey Historic Sites Division:
  - Luyster House - Original Construction date and builder unknown.
  - Smock House
  - Collier Estate
  - Gordon House - Original house built 1750 additions built circa 1800 & remodeled in 1940.
  - Cox Farm
  - Halloran Farm
  - Old Kentuck - Built 1770.
  - Pleasant Valley Schoolhouse site
  - Schanck Farm
  - Smock Farmhouse
  - Reid Farmhouse
  - Lake Farmhouse
  - John Schanck House - Built circa 1697.
  - Garret Schank House - Built circa 1690.
  - Daniel Schanck House
  - Embree House
  - Schanck House
  - Cannon Hill Farm
  - Raymere House - Built by Jacob Van Doren in 1753.
  - Indian Log Schoolhouse
  - Applegate Homested
  - John Holmes House

== Historic markers ==
- In 1971, a historic marker was placed on Pleasant Valley Road near the barn where the Trotter George M. Patchen was born. The marker was placed by the (now defunct) Pleasant Valley Historic Society
- In 1967, the Daughters of the American Revolution placed a historic marker in the Pleasant Valley commemorating the area as the "Hornets Nest". The plaque reads "The Hornets Nest - In the American Revolution, Pleasant Valley, From Marlboro thru Holmdel, was Called the Hornets Nest by the British because the men here, Besides regular army duty, constantly stung them by capturing and sinking ships in sandy hook bay and seizing the Tories to exchange for prisoners. - Placed by Monmouth Court House Chapter Daughters of the American Revolution 1967"

== Unusual local events ==
- Sponsored by the Monmouth County Hunt Racing Association, in the 1930s the area was known for lending its name to the "Pleasant Valley Cup". This is a cup won in a half mile horse race. The requirement for entering the race is that the horse has to come from a farm "owned by a Monmouth County farmer". The winner received a trophy cup and $50.00
- There were Two plane crashes in the area:
  - On June 29, 1932, Pleasant Valley was the site of a plane crash. The plane was piloted by State Trooper Douglas Stender. He sustained injuries in the crash and lost site in one eye as a result of the crash.
  - On November 16, 1939, Paul Tergis crashed his plane after engine trouble on a farm. He reportedly escaped injury.
