= Engineer (horse) =

British-bred Thoroughbred racehorse

Engineer (foaled c. 1756) was a brown English Thoroughbred stallion bred by William Fenton of Glass House, near Leeds, Yorkshire. His outstanding son was Mambrino, although he sired some good race horses, such as King's Plate winner Fireworker, and Black Tom, and a number of his daughters gained distinction as broodmares.

== Sire line tree ==
- Engineer
  - Mambrino
    - Messenger
      - Tippoo Saib
        - Financier
      - Potomac
      - Hambletonian
      - Saratoga
        - Dove
      - Mambrino
        - Abdallah
        - Mambrino Paymaster
    - Carlo Khan
    - Guildford
  - Black Tom

== Pedigree ==
Pedigree of Engineer, brown stallion, c.1755
Sire Sampson b. 1745	Blaze b. 1733	Flying Childers b. 1715	Darley Arabian
Sire Sampson b. 1745	Blaze b. 1733	Flying Childers b. 1715	Betty Leedes
Sire Sampson b. 1745	Blaze b. 1733	Confederate Filly; 1720	Grey Grantham
Sire Sampson b. 1745	Blaze b. 1733	Confederate Filly; 1720	Rutland Black Mare
Sire Sampson b. 1745	Hip Mare	Hip gr. 1716	Curwen's Bay Barb*
Sire Sampson b. 1745	Hip Mare	Hip gr. 1716	Sister To Hobby
Sire Sampson b. 1745	Hip Mare	Spark Mare	Spark
Sire Sampson b. 1745	Hip Mare	Spark Mare	Snake Mare
Dam Young Greyhound Mare	Young Greyhound gr. 1718	Greyhound gr. 1701	Chillaby Barb
Dam Young Greyhound Mare	Young Greyhound gr. 1718	Greyhound gr. 1701	Slugey
Dam Young Greyhound Mare	Young Greyhound gr. 1718	Crofts Pet Mare	Wastell Turk
Dam Young Greyhound Mare	Young Greyhound gr. 1718	Crofts Pet Mare	Hautboy Mare
Dam Young Greyhound Mare	Curwen Barb Mare	Curwen's Bay Barb* b. c.1690	(unknown)
Dam Young Greyhound Mare	Curwen Barb Mare	Curwen's Bay Barb* b. c.1690	(unknown)
Dam Young Greyhound Mare	Curwen Barb Mare	(unknown)	(unknown)
Dam Young Greyhound Mare	Curwen Barb Mare	(unknown)	(unknown)

* Engineer is inbred 4S x 3D to the stallion Curwen's Bay Barb, meaning that he appears fourth generation on the sire side of his pedigree and third generation on the dam side of his pedigree.
