= McKinney (horse) =

American Standardbred sire

McKinney (1887–1917) was an American Standardbred horse. A descendant of Hambletonian 10, he is considered one of the most important sires in the development of the modern Standardbred breed. McKinney was 15.2 hands high.

== History ==
McKinney created a bloodline in the making of the American Standardbred through the Hambletonian 10 offspring George Wilkes. McKinney was bred by H. H. Wilson, Abdallah Park, Lexington, Kentucky. In 1887 McKinney was sold to Charles A. Durfee and taken to California to be developed by Jim Durfee and used as a sire at the same time. In the year of 1902 he changed owners twice. First he went to Bloomington, Indiana. Later William Simpson bought him, to be in service at Empire State Stud in the state of New York. All by all he would very well have produced more than 1400 foals.

=== Pedigree ===
McKinney's pedigree chart

Tail-male pedigree: Alcyone - George Wilkes - Hambletonian.
Tail-female pedigree: Rosa Sprague by Governor Sprague - Rose Kenney by Mambrino Messenger - Dame by Mambrino Chief - Dam by Napoleon - Dam by Jenkin's Potomac.

== Offspring ==
The blood of McKinney kept a toehold in Sweden through the sire King Bunter, who got nearly 600 offsprings.

King Bunter's tail-male pedigree: Bunter Hanover - Bunter (US) - Belwin (US) - McKinney (US).

Sire line descent tree
- McKinney
  - Zombro
    - San Francisco
  - Belwin
    - Bunter
      - Bunter Hanover
        - King Bunter
