= Palo Alto Stock Farm Horse Barn =

- U.S. National Register of Historic Places
- California Historical Landmark
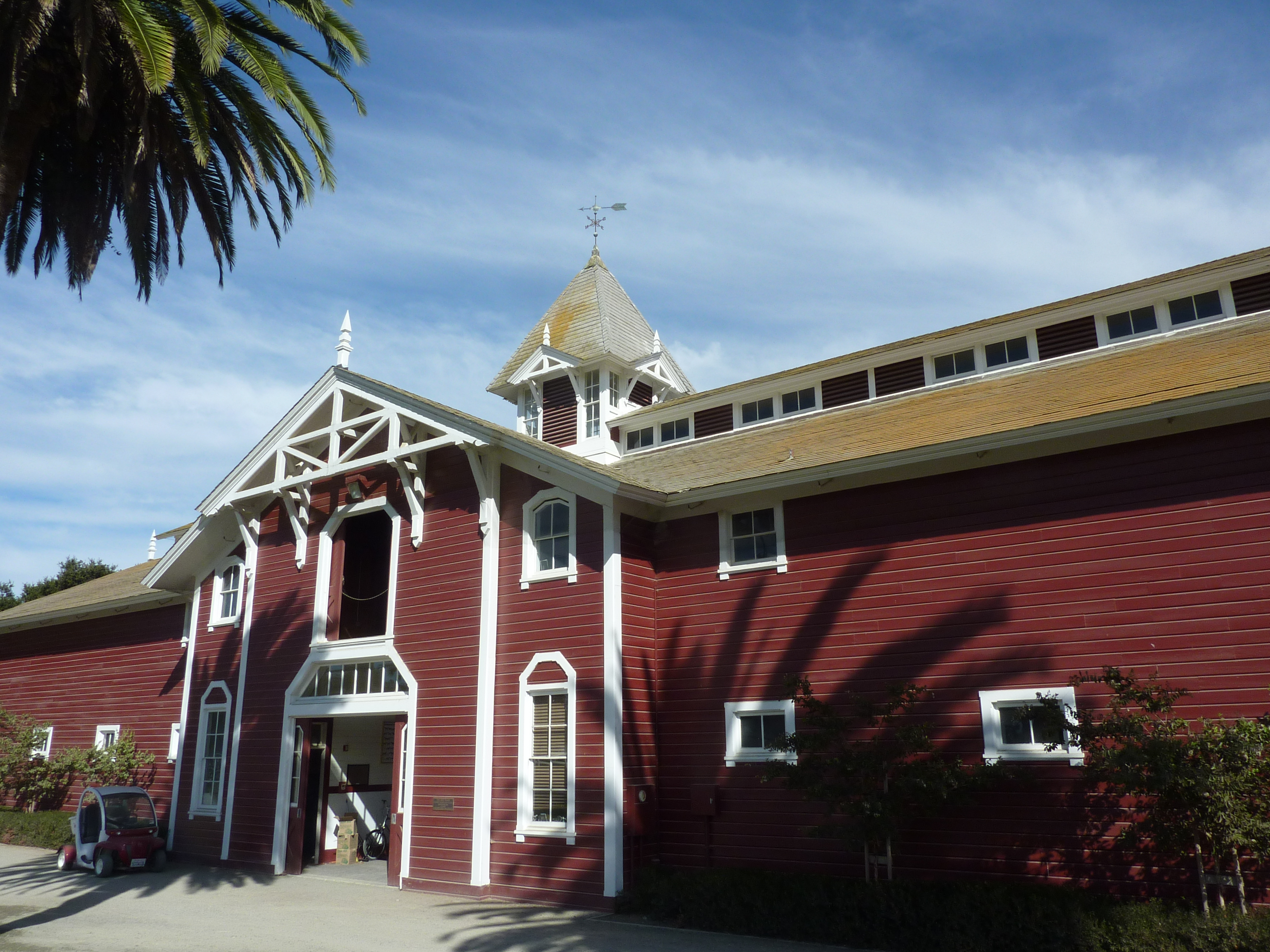
- Eadweard Muybridge and the development of motion pictures

- Location within San Francisco Bay Area Location within California
- Location: 621 Fremont Road, Stanford, California
- Coordinates: 37°25′29″N 122°11′04″W
- Built: c.1878–1880
- Architectural style: Stick-Eastlake
- NRHP reference No.: 85003325
- CHISL No.: 834

Significant dates
- Added to NRHP: December 12, 1985
- Designated CHISL: November 3, 1969

Palo Alto Stock Farm Horse Barn, also known as Stanford Red Barn or Stanford Stables, is located at present-day address 621 Fremont Road in Stanford, California. This barn was established c.1878-1880 and is an example of Victorian-era Stick-Eastlake style architecture, though the architect is unknown. Palo Alto Stock Farm Horse Barn has been listed on the National Register of Historic Places since 1985. There are only two original buildings left from the Palo Alto Stock Farm: the red barn and the brick stable.

== History ==
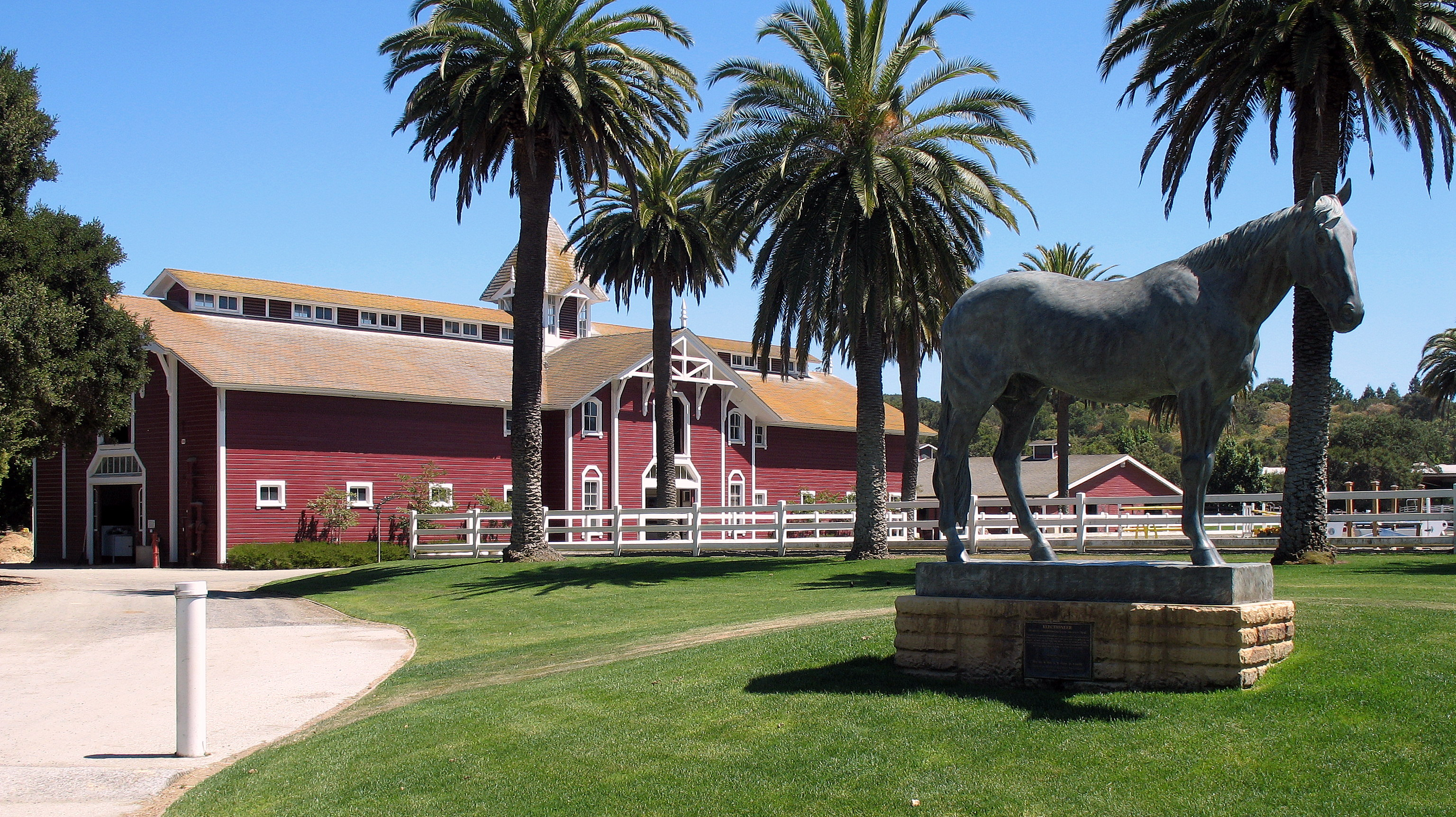
Electioneer statue and Palo Alto Stock Farm Horse Barn

The property had been part of the Mexican land grant of Rancho San Francisquito, granted to Antonio Jose Buelna in 1839. After California became part of the United States, Buelna's widow María Concepción Valencia was involved in a prolonged struggle with American squatters on the rancho. In the 1863, a wealthy San Franciscan George Gordon bought out both Buelna's heirs and the squatters and turned the property into his personal estate, which he called Mayfield Grange, after the nearby town of Mayfield, now Palo Alto.

Following the death of Gordon in 1869 and his wife and only daughter in 1874, Gordon's remaining heirs sold Leland Stanford the Mayfield Grange property in 1876, consisting of approximately 650 acres along San Francisquito Creek. In the following years, Stanford acquired about 8,000 acres of land in the surrounding area. The red barn was the center of the stock farm in the early years, and additionally there was a carriage house, a colt barn and a training barn. In the 21st century, there are only two original buildings left from the Palo Alto Stock Farm, the red barn and the brick stable.

From 1878 to 1880 the barn served as a training stable for the stock farm. In 1877 the stallion Electioneer was brought to the barn and lived there for 14 years, in order to breed and train faster horses. One of the early innovations to come from the farm included a "school" to train 5-month-old colts to trot around a small track to encourage this behavior. Stanford advocated co-educational universities during a time when this was not a popular idea; this may have been partially based on his observing at the barn the relationship of the mother of a colt being trained and its effect on teaching her offspring properly, suggesting the importance of the first five years in a child's development and the need for an educated mother.

In c.1877, photographer Eadweard Muybridge's series of stop-action photographs of horses running Sallie Gardner at a Gallop was photographed at Palo Alto Stock Farm. In order to take the photograph, Muybridge built a stage with 24 cameras with a trip wire and discover galloping horses did momentarily have all four hooves leave the ground. This discovery was a precursor to the technology for the motion picture industry.

By 1903 the farm was closed and the horses sold in order to maintain the university, though by 1946, university president Donald Tresidder reopened the building for equestrian use. In the mid-1980s, the barn became the home of Stanford University's equestrian team. In 1985, L.W. “Bill” Lane Jr. and their family donated a statue of Electioneer, currently located in the entrance to the equestrian center. In 1983 and in 2004 there were large restorations and renovations of the barn done while maintaining much of the original material, this funded by L.W. “Bill” Lane Jr. and John Arrillaga.

== Landmark status ==
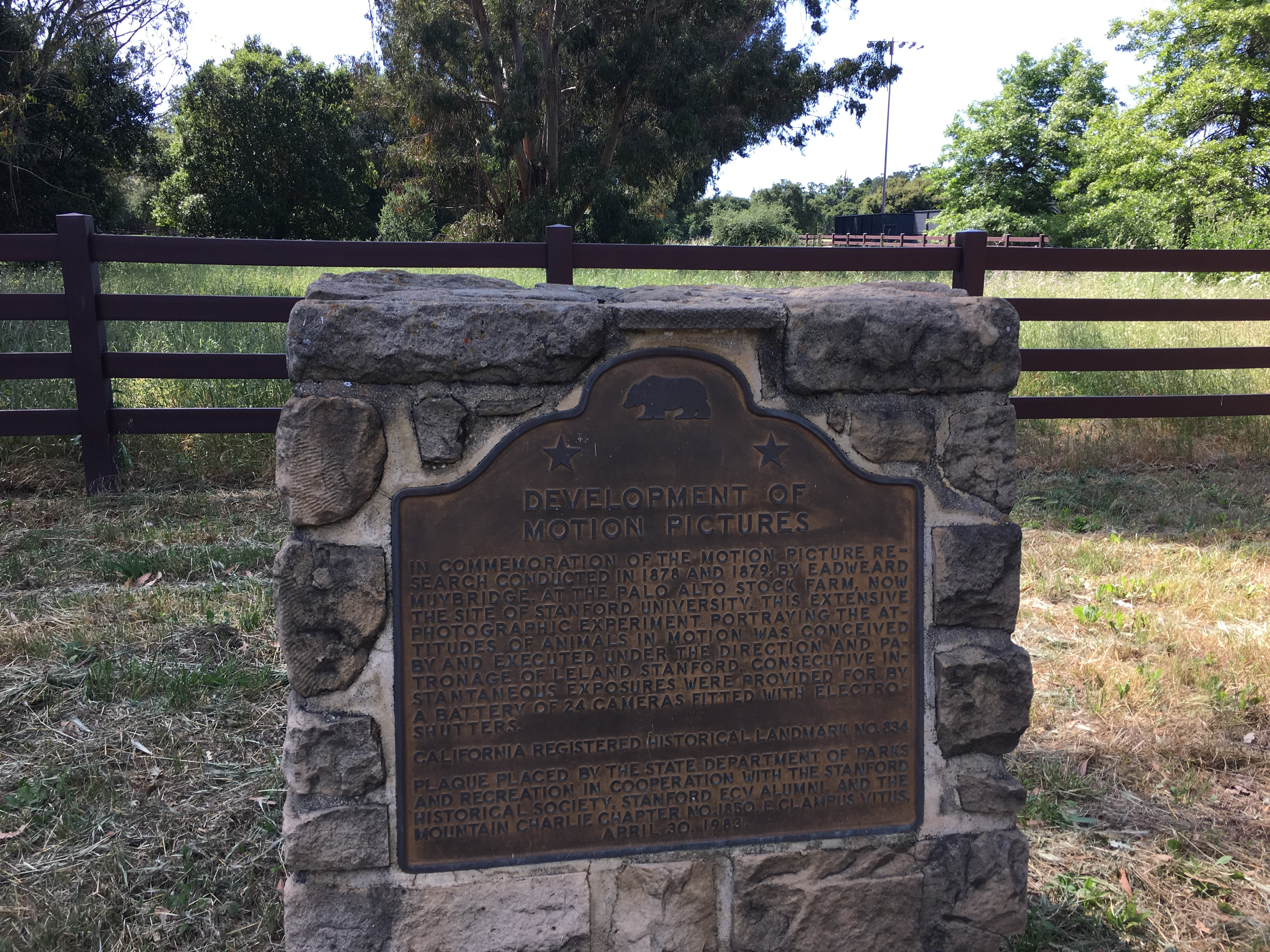
Development of Motion Pictures Landmark #834

On November 3, 1969, the Office of Historic Preservation designated Eadweard Muybridge and the Development of Motion Pictures as a California historical landmark #834. A description on the commemorative plaque reads: "In commemoration of the motion picture research conducted in 1878 and 1879 by Eadweard Muybridge at the Palo Alto Stock Farm, now the site of Stanford University. This extensive photographic experiment portraying the attitudes of animals in motion was conceived by and executed under the direction and patronage of Leland Stanford. Consecutive instantaneous exposures were provided for a battery of 24 cameras fitted with electroshutters."

== See also ==
- National Register of Historic Places listings in Santa Clara County, California
