= Messenger (horse) =

Late 18th century Thoroughbred stallion

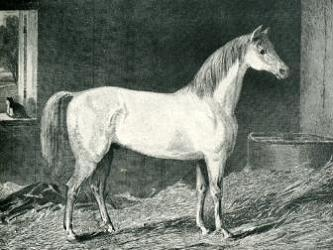
- Painting of Messenger by George Stubbs
- Breed: Thoroughbred
- Sire: Mambrino
- Grandsire: Engineer
- Dam: Turf Mare (Unnamed)
- Maternal grandsire: Turf
- Sex: Stallion
- Foaled: 1780
- Died: January 28, 1808 (aged 27–28)
- Country: Great Britain
- Color: Gray
- Breeder: Richard Grosvenor

Messenger (1780 – January 28, 1808) was an English Thoroughbred stallion imported into the newly formed United States of America just after the American Revolution. He is most famous for being the great-grandsire of Hambletonian 10, the father of all American Standardbred horses. Though he did not have a long racing career himself, he was a common ancestor in many successful racing horses into the 20th century.

== Breeding ==
Messenger was a grey Thoroughbred bred by John Pratt, Esq. of Newmarket, England He was most likely foaled at Oxford Stud in Balsham, Cambridgeshire in 1780.

In May 1788, Sir Thomas Benger imported Messenger to Pennsylvania by ship. Legend goes that the eight year old horse ran down the gangplank "so rambunctiously that it took two men to keep him under control," when the rest of the horses were too weary to move after the long voyage.

In 1793, Messenger was sold to Henry Astor, the brother of John Jacob Astor, and maintained at the farm of Philip Pratt located in Corona, Queens at what is now occupied by Our Lady of Sorrows Church. He was later sold to C.W. Van Ranst.

Messenger's appearance gave an impression of solidity and power. He had large and always active ears, a large and bony head; his nose had a decided Roman shape, the nostrils large and flexible. He had a large windpipe and short neck, but not coarse or thick, low withers and around the shoulders, heavy and upright. Messenger had superior hips and quarters. The bones of the limbs were strong and large. He always stood prompt and upright on all four legs. He was 15.3 hands (63 inches, 160 cm) high. One article described the way he carried himself as "perfect and striking."

Messenger was more brutish than he was beautiful. Handlers would have to take care not to get injured when working with the horse.

== Racing career ==
Messenger won 10 of 16 races run in England early in his career, with his best racing years being 1783, 1784, and 1785. Messenger's races, usually less than two and half miles, were mainly "match" races in which the side bets far exceeded the purse. His major career win at five years old, when he won the King's Plate race. He was "a crack at the sprint distances of a mile and a mile and a quarter." Although his sire was a trotter, Messenger never ran a trot race.

== Offspring and legacy ==
Messenger was a highly virile stud, once serving 126 mares by natural cover in one season. Like the other three English stallions, and as was the custom of the day, Messenger was bred throughout Pennsylvania, New York and New Jersey. The custom at the time was to allow any person that could afford it to breed their mare with the horse as he toured around the new country. An ad from 1788 in a Philadelphia paper announces Messenger's arrival and availability in the area to the local mares as, "JUST IMPORTED, The Capital, Strong, Full Blooded English Stallion MESSENGER, To cover Mares this season...at the very low price of Three Guineas each Mare, one Dollar to the Groom..." which appears along a sketch of the grey horse. Due to the rarity of Thoroughbred horses in the area at the time and the success of the horse's offspring, Messenger's stud fee spiked at around $40 (about $2,900 in 2022).

Though the mares he bred with were not of the highest quality, he sired a great many successful racehorses. Messenger's daughter, Miller's Damsel, also known as "Queen of the American Turf", gave birth to the horse his breeder named American Eclipse in the belief the foal would be as great as the famous English Eclipse. By Duroc, a fine son of Diomed, American Eclipse did indeed turn out to be a champion. He was not only a great sire of Thoroughbreds, he was also the founding father of the harness breed, or modern-day American Standardbred through his great grandson, Rysdyk's (Hambletonian 10). His genes have also contributed to the American Saddlebred, and Tennessee Walking Horse breeds. Other notable descendants of Messenger include Whirlaway, Equipoise, Man O War, and Gallant Fox. He also provided genetics for the high cost "Joe Young" brand of horses that were sought after in the greater Kansas area at the turn of the 20th century.

Messenger died on January 8, 1808, at the age of 28 at Townsend Cock's farm near Oyster Bay, New York. He was buried with military honors under a boulder memorialized with an inscribed plaque at Piping Rock Club on Duck Pond Road in Matinecock, New York. He was inducted into the United States Harness Racing Hall of Fame in 1964.

This horse was not particularly talented at racing, but "deserves recognition as an outstanding producer of thoroughbreds," according to John Hervey, a horse historian in the 1960's.

== Sire line tree ==
- Messenger
  - Coriander
    - Topgallant (Standardbred)
  - Tippoo Saib
    - Financier
  - Potomac
  - Hambletonian (Standardbred)
  - Saratoga
    - Dove (Standardbred)
  - Mambrino
    - Abdallah
      - Hambletonian 10 (Standardbred)
        - Abdallah
        - Shark
        - Major Winfield
        - George Wilkes (Tennessee Walking Horse)
        - Volunteer
        - Hambletonian Second
        - Dexter
        - Dictator
        - Happy Medium
        - Electioneer
      - Conklin's Abdallah
        - Rarus
    - Mambrino Paymaster
      - Mambrino Chief
        - Ashland
        - Clark Chief
          - Harrison Chief (American Saddlebred)
        - Highland Chief
        - Mambrino Patchen (Tennessee Walking Horse)

== Pedigree ==
Along with three other stallions, (Medley, Sharp, and Diomed), Messenger provided the type of foal that was needed for the era of long-distance (stamina and speed) racing popular in the early days of the American sport.

He was sired by Mambrino, who was sired by Engineer, who was sired by Sampson, who was the sire of Bay Malton, a racing horse. His dam was Turf; grand-dam was Regulus, who was closely related to Leviathan, a racing horse. Messenger was inbred to Cade in the third and fourth generations of his pedigree. Mambrino also traced straight back to Blaze, the father of trotters. Messenger has crosses to all three of the Thoroughbred foundation sires, particularly Godolphin Arabian.

Pedigree of Messenger (GB), gr. h. 1780
Sire Mambrino gr. 1763	Engineer br. 1755	Sampson; 1745	Blaze
Sire Mambrino gr. 1763	Engineer br. 1755	Sampson; 1745	Mare by Hip
Sire Mambrino gr. 1763	Engineer br. 1755	Mare by Young Greyhound	Young Greyhound
Sire Mambrino gr. 1763	Engineer br. 1755	Mare by Young Greyhound	Mare by Curwen Barb
Sire Mambrino gr. 1763	Mare by Cade gr. 1751	Cade† br. 1734	Godolphin Arabian‡
Sire Mambrino gr. 1763	Mare by Cade gr. 1751	Cade† br. 1734	Roxana
Sire Mambrino gr. 1763	Mare by Cade gr. 1751	Mare by Little John gr. ~1741	Bolton Little John
Sire Mambrino gr. 1763	Mare by Cade gr. 1751	Mare by Little John gr. ~1741	Durham's Favorite
Dam Sister to Hyacinth blk. 1774	Turf b. 1760	Matchem b. 1748	Cade†
Dam Sister to Hyacinth blk. 1774	Turf b. 1760	Matchem b. 1748	Mare by Partner
Dam Sister to Hyacinth blk. 1774	Turf b. 1760	Mare by Starling	Ancaster Starling
Dam Sister to Hyacinth blk. 1774	Turf b. 1760	Mare by Starling	Miss Romp
Dam Sister to Hyacinth blk. 1774	Mare by Regulus b. 1761	Regulus ch. 1739	Godolphin Arabian‡
Dam Sister to Hyacinth blk. 1774	Mare by Regulus b. 1761	Regulus ch. 1739	Grey Robinson
Dam Sister to Hyacinth blk. 1774	Mare by Regulus b. 1761	Mare by Starling blk. 1753	Ancaster Starling
Dam Sister to Hyacinth blk. 1774	Mare by Regulus b. 1761	Mare by Starling blk. 1753	Sister (1740) to Slipby (1)

Note: b. = Bay, blk. = Black, br. = Brown, ch. = Chestnut, gr. = Gray

† Messenger is inbred 3S × 4D to the stallion Cade, meaning that he appears third generation on the sire side of his pedigree and fourth generation on the dam side of his pedigree.

‡ Messenger is inbred 4S × 5D x 4D to the stallion Godolphin Arabian, meaning that he appears fourth generation once, and fifth generation once (via Cade)^ on the sire side of his pedigree and fourth generation once on the dam side of his pedigree.

== See also ==
- Horse breeding
