= George Wilkes (horse) =

American-bred Standardbred racehorse

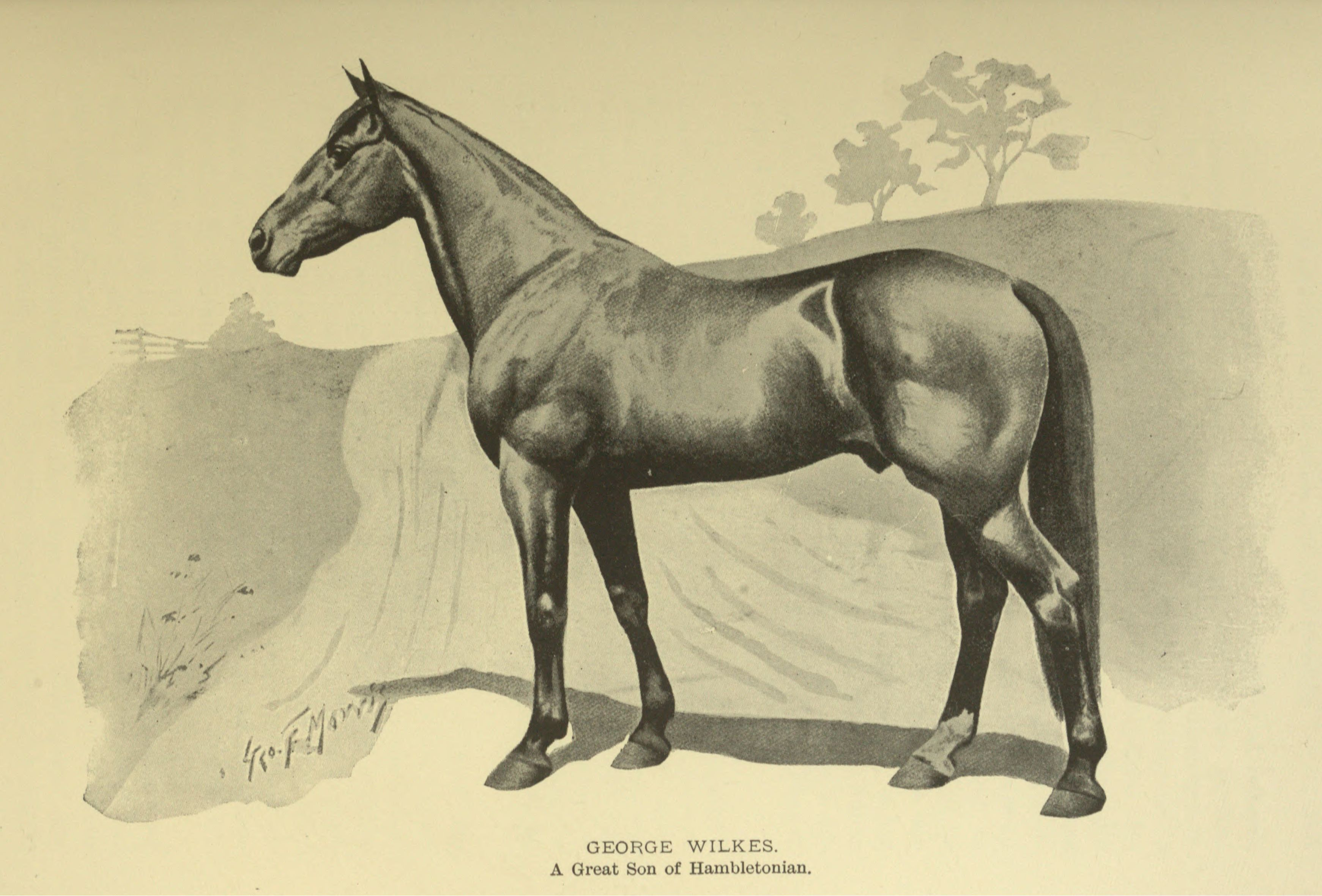
- Breed: Standardbred
- Sire: Hambletonian 10
- Grandsire: Abdallah
- Dam: Dolly Spanker
- Damsire: Henry Clay
- Sex: Stallion
- Foaled: 1856
- Died: May 28, 1882
- Country: United States
- Colour: Bay
- Owner: Thomas Felter
- Record: 2:22

Honours
- United States Harness Racing Hall of Fame (1955)

George Wilkes (1856 – May 28, 1882), formerly known as Robert Fillingham, was an American trotting horse and foundation sire. In 1955, George Wilkes was inducted into the United States Harness Racing Hall of Fame.

== Origin and early years ==
First called Robert Fillingham, he was bred in Orange County, New York, and was owned by Col. Thomas Felter of Greenwood Lake.

Foaled in 1856, he was sired by Hambletonian 10. His dam was Dolly Spanker, who was sired by Henry Clay. Felter's $25 stud fee to Hambletonian 10 in 1855 produced Robert Fillingham, Dolly's first colt. When Dolly Spanker died foaling him, he was raised by hand on cow's milk, old Jamaica rum, and loaf sugar.

He was a brown horse with one white hind foot, the most highly-developed son of Hambletonian 10.

== Racing career ==
The colt showed speed in early training as a three-year-old and was sold for $4,000 to W. L. Simmons.

At five, he began harness racing under the name Robert Fillingham, used during his early turf career, and won his debut at the Fashion Course on August 1, 1861. After his first win, he was brought home and carefully conditioned for a major race the next year against the champion, Ethan Allen. At the Fashion Course on September 10, 1862, he overcame Ethan Allen in straight heats, posting times of 2:24¾, 2:25¾, and 2:31 and taking home $10,000. He later beat Rockingham to harness at the Fashion Course on June 2, 1863, and defeated him again a week later to saddle, clocking a best time of 2:24. In Philadelphia on October 10, 1863, he bested Lancet to harness, distancing him in a second heat timed at 2:24. This was his last win racing as Robert Fillingham.

In 1864, his owners decided to change the horse's name to George Wilkes in honor of George Wilkes of the Spirit of the Times. After taking on his new name, the horse set the world record for stallions. George Wilkes passed through the hands of many trainers and drivers but stayed owned and managed by the Simmons brothers, who used him as a gambling tool.

On October 26, 1865, at Long Island's Union Course, he beat Commodore Vanderbilt to harness, and on November 6 of the same year, he defeated him again in a wagon race.

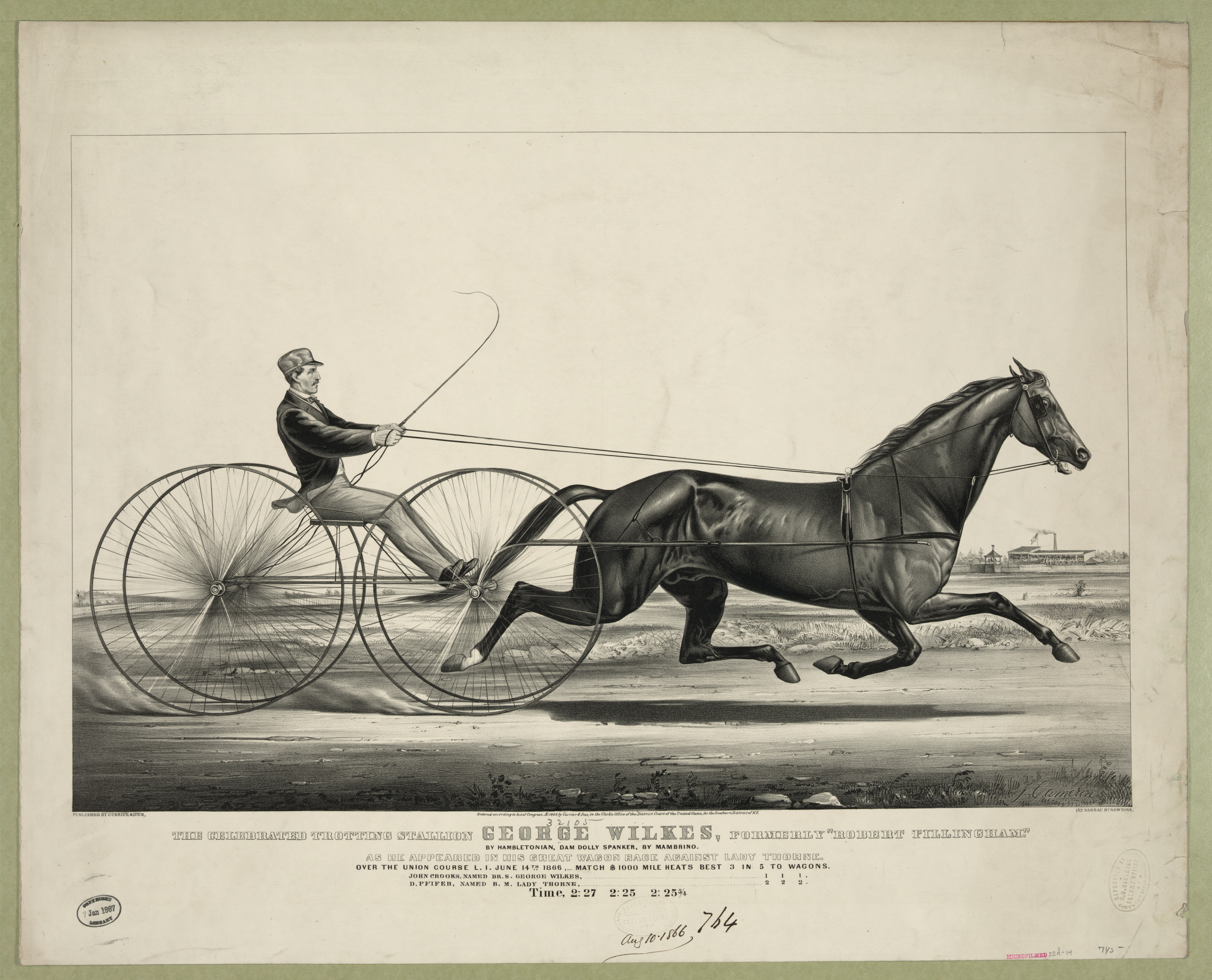
The Celebrated Trotting Stallion George Wilkes During His Great Wagon Race Against Lady Thorne, Currier & Ives, 1866

On June 14, 1866, George Wilkes, driven by John Crooks, faced the famed trotting mare Lady Thorne. They competed at Union Course, Long Island, in a $1,000 wagon race of mile heats, best three out of five.

He won against Lady Thorne on June 8, 1868, over Union Course in straight heats, recording a best time of 2:25. Six days later, he beat her to wagons at the same place in straight heats again. The times recorded were 2:27, 2:25, and 2:25.4. He also beat the noted trotters, Rhode Island (2:234), Lucy (2:18), and American Girl (2:16).

His record, 2.22, was made in a race trotted at Narragansett Park, Rhode Island, on October 13, 1868, against Rhode Island and Duroc Prince. He lowered the stallion record from 2:23¼.

Growing older, the brutal whip in his races embittered him, causing resistance and a shift from good-natured to moody.

The brown Hambletonian stallion campaigned until he was seventeen years old. George Wilkes proved himself the third-fastest trotter of his era, racing under saddle, to wagon, and sulky, and always finishing in the money. With fifty-six wins in sixty-nine heats clocked at 2:30 or better, his turf career was unrivaled among the sons of Hambletonian. His twenty-seven wins brought in $50,150 in purses. George Wilkes's record was 2:22 to harness, 2:25 to wagon, and 2:28 to double.

== Stud record ==
In 1873, the stallion was placed at stud and kept in Kentucky. Of Hambletonian's offspring, George Wilkes was one of four who founded sire lines leading to nearly all of today's American trotters and pacers. He was the progenitor of the Wilkes family of American trotters, regarded as one of the world's top speed-producing lines. George Wilkes's sons were in great demand, and a colt of his bloodline, known as "gilt‑edged," sold for far more than colts of other lines.

His record as a sire of trotting speed was unequaled for his years at stud, with George Wilkes credited with twelve in the 2:30 list by 1881. Among his offspring were Harry Wilkes (2:13½), Guy Wilkes (2:15¼), Wilson (2:16¼), Mike Wilkes (2:15¾), So-So (2:17¼), Rosa Wilkes (2:18¼), Joe Bunker (2:19¼), Wilton (2:19¼), Flora Wilkes (2:19½), and Tom Rogers (2:20), plus fifty others with records between 2:20 and 2:30. His sons sired fifty-four trotters, including Oliver K. (2:16¼), Phil Thompson (2:16½), William H. (2:18½), and Prince Wilkes (2:16). His daughters produced seven, such as Butterfly (2:19¾) and Eagle Bird (2:21).

William L., a son of George Wilkes, was the sire of the famed trotter Axtell (2:12). By 1910, five of the top ten producing sires were offspring of George Wilkes, with two more sired by his sons.

He remained in the stud for approximately eight years prior to his death.

== Sire line tree ==
- George Wilkes
  - Red Wilkes
    - Ashland Wilkes
      - John R Gentry
  - Onward
    - Allandorf
      - Black Allan
        - Roan Allen
        - Hunter's Allen
    - Anderson Wilkes
      - Single G
  - Alcyone
    - McKinney
      - Zombro
      - Belwin
  - Patchen Wilkes
    - Joe Patchen
      - Dan Patch
  - William L
    - Axtell
      - Axworthy
        - Guy Axworthy

== Death ==
George Wilkes, the founder of the Wilkes family, died in Kentucky, United States, on May 28, 1882, at age 26.

== Legacy ==
In 1955, George Wilkes was inducted into the United States Harness Racing Hall of Fame.

== See also ==
- List of racehorses

== Gallery ==
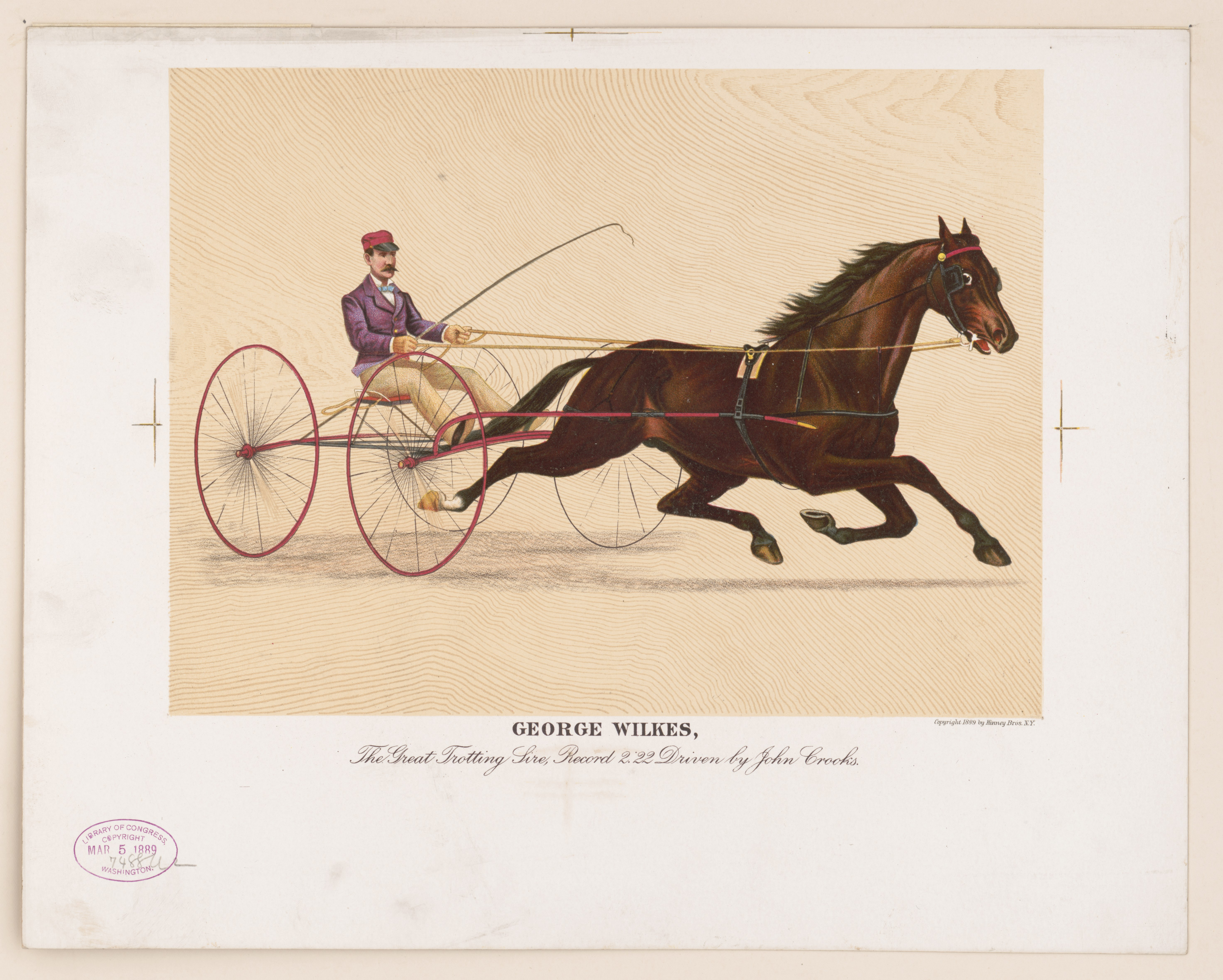
George Wilkes, The Great Trotting Sire, Record 2:22, Driven by John Crooks, 1889, Kinney Bros.
