= Old Kentuck =

Historic house in New Jersey, United States

- U.S. National Register of Historic Places
- New Jersey Register of Historic Places
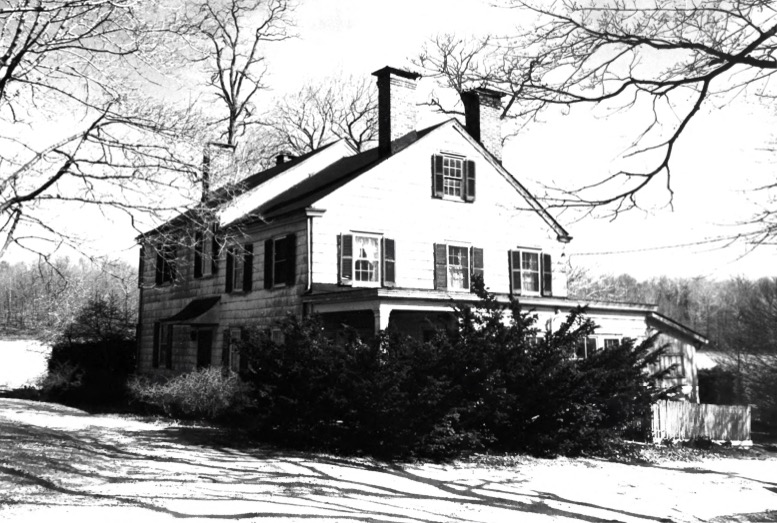
- 1973 photo from nomination form

- Location within Monmouth County, New Jersey Location within New Jersey Location within the United States
- Location: Pleasant Valley Road, Marlboro Township, New Jersey
- Coordinates: 40°21′57.6″N 74°13′12″W
- Area: 9 acres (3.6 ha)
- Built: 1770
- Architectural style: Federal
- NRHP reference No.: 73001118
- NJRHP No.: 2015

Significant dates
- Added to NRHP: November 6, 1973
- Designated NJRHP: September 14, 1973

Old Kentuck, also known as the Asher Holmes House, is located on Pleasant Valley Road in the Pleasant Valley section of Marlboro Township in Monmouth County, New Jersey, United States. The farmhouse was built in 1770 and was added to the National Register of Historic Places on November 6, 1973, for its significance in architecture and military history. First recorded owner was Asher Holmes, a veteran of the American Revolutionary War. According to the nomination form, the two-story house features Federal architecture influence on original Dutch architecture. As of 2024, the house has been demolished.

== See also ==
- National Register of Historic Places listings in Monmouth County, New Jersey
