= Asher Holmes =

American politician and veteran

Asher Holmes (February 16, 1740 – June 20, 1808) was an American politician and veteran of the American Revolution.

== Early life and family ==
He was born to Samuel and Hulda Holmes (née. Mott). His birthplace was a plantation called the Scotchester in Pleasant Valley, Marlboro Township, Monmouth County, New Jersey. He was married to Sarah (née. Watson) on February 21, 1771, and had four children. They lived in the Pleasant Valley section of Marlboro Township in a house he called "Old Kentuck". He was a land surveyor by trade.

Holmes is buried at the Holmdel Baptist Church cemetery.

== Military service ==
=== Overview ===
He served primarily in the 1st Regiment, Monmouth County Militia during the American Revolutionary War. General Lafayette, in a letter to General Washington described the militia commanded by Asher Holmes:

I found the rifleman even above their reputation, and the militia above all expectation I could have formed of them.

In April 1782, Holmes was one of 14 Monmouth County patriots who signed a 5-page petition to General Washington demanding revenge for the killing of Captain Joshua Huddy by loyalists. Washington ordered that a British POW equal in rank to Huddy be hanged in retaliation. This precipitated what became known as the Asgill Affair.

=== List of commands ===
His list of commands was as follows:

- Captain, First Regiment, Monmouth County Militia
- First Major, First Regiment, Monmouth County Militia - November 28, 1776
- Colonel, First Regiment, Monmouth County Militia - March 27, 1778
- Colonel, Regiment of New Jersey State Troops - October 9, 1779
- Colonel, Battalion of NJ State Troops - June 7, 1780 - a small battalion of 262 men

=== Battle involvement ===
He was noted to have been involved in the Battle of Germantown and the Battle of Monmouth, Navesink, Conushonk and Pleasant Valley engagements. He captured a frigate in Deal Lake and commanded a militia to respond to the Pine Robbers attack in Pleasant Valley in 1778. He was known to have made a failed attack on a British baggage train with a loss of one man on his side and four British soldiers. In 1779, a raiding party 800 people strong, commanded by a Colonel Hide, raided multiple areas of Monmouth County. One skirmish was at Ganet's Hill and another at the Palmer House, both in Middletown. They created skirmishes in Middletown along Kings Highway, Red Bank, Tinton Falls and Shrewsbury.

It was reported that the British were met by a militia commanded by Col. Asher Holmes and Captain Burrowes and pushed back to Staten Island. Using a whaleboat, in 1779, he captured a British ship, the Brigantine Britannia, in the Sandy Hook bay. It had just arrived from England with supplies. He was also noted to have been involved with militia officer exchanges when an officer was captured.

=== Signal fires ===
Under the general order of George Washington, Asher Holmes was also responsible for the militia signal fires which were set up and would be lit only if the British were to invade Monmouth or Middlesex county. He constructed three signal fires, two in Middletown and one on Mount Pleasant (now known as Beacon Hill) in Marlboro Township, New Jersey. Built from logs, the signal fires were 16–18 feet square at the base and 20 feet in height. They were constructed and filled with dry brush to be lit quickly, if needed.

== Political activities ==
Holmes was one of 436 signers of the document which suggested that "For every article of personal property so taken from good subjects, reprisals shall be made of loyalists." In 1774, he was appointed to the Committee of Correspondence and then the Committee of Observation and inspection (a forerunner to the Continental Congress). Following the Revolutionary War, he was a Justice of the Peace and then High Sheriff of Monmouth County. He was a member of the New Jersey Legislative Council from 1786 to 1787.

== Buildings named after Holmes ==
Asher Holmes Elementary School, located in Marlboro Township, New Jersey, is named after him.
