= Clay Trotting Horses =

Extinct American horse breed

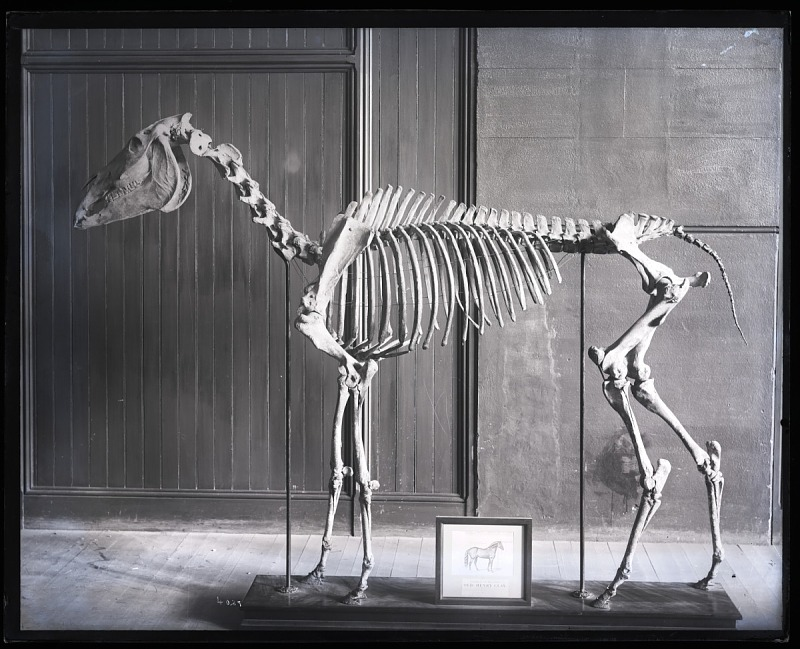
Mounted Skeleton of Horse, "Old Henry Clay"

Clay trotting horses were an American strain of trotting horse during the 19th century that is no longer extant, but has descendants in the Standardbred.

== Early years ==
In 1818 Richard B. Jones, the American Consul in Tripoli, acquired a stallion named Grand Bashaw. Grand Bashaw was the sire of Young Bashaw, who in turn sired Andrew Jackson, which became noted as a trotting racehorse. From a mare named Old Surrey or Lady Surrey, Andrew Jackson sired Henry Clay, who became the foundation sire of the Clay strain.

The Smithsonian says this about him:

Old Henry Clay, often called "America's National Thoroughbred Trotting Horse" or "Father of American Trotting Horses", was foaled on Long Island in 1837 and purchased by Colonel William W. Wadsworth of Seneso, Livingston County, New York. When his days as a famous trotting horse were over, he was used for breeding and finally died at Lodi, New York in the spring of 1867. In life the horse stood 15 1/4 hands high (61 inches).

The Clays were recognized as a family of trotting horses in the mid-19th century, through to the end of the century. By the end of the century, however, it had almost become extinct, through breeding to other strains. Sometimes they were referred to the Bashaw strain.

Among his descendants was a trotting horse stallion named Cassius Clay. Randolph Huntington, a horse breeder, noticed after the American Civil War that Clays were becoming increasingly rare.

Writing to a friend on Nov. 2, 1888, Huntington said,

"I know the horse [Henry Clay] thoroughly well and also his get. Residing in Brooklyn I knew also the horses there and on Long Island ... practical experience in handling and driving as a young man, as a matured man and as a dealer during and after the [Civil] war, I found my opinions in favor of the blood advocated. My investment was between $40,000 and $50,000."

== Linden Tree and Leopard ==
In 1877, Ulysses S. Grant, who was traveling in modern-day Turkey, was given two stallions by Abdul Hamid II, the Sultan of the Ottoman Empire. These two horses were Linden Tree, a Barb and Leopard, an Arabian.

Randolph Huntingdon bred a number of Clay trotting mares to Grant's two stallions and used the resulting foals in his breeding program, which he called "Clay horses" or "Clay-Arabs".

The following quotation is also taken from the Oyster Bay Pilot:

We have the effort of Mr. Randolph Huntington to establish a type by mixing the blood of General Grant's Arab stallions with the mares of the Clay family. It will be recalled that when General Grant made his famous tour of the world he stopped at Constantinople, and was entertained by the Sultan, who gave the American soldier, as a souvenir of his visit, two stallions, Leopard and Linden Tree. These horses were landed in 1879, and Mr. Huntington at once began making arrangements to breed to them. Mr. Huntington has theories as to in-breeding, or close breeding, as he prefers to call it, that are more in consonance with the ideas that prevail abroad than here. Of interest to the sports enthusiast is the record of one Clay stallion with the name Cassius. Although extinct now, the Clays did contribute to the creation of another American breed, the Standardbred Trotting Horse.
