= Mambrino (horse) =

British Thoroughbred racehorse

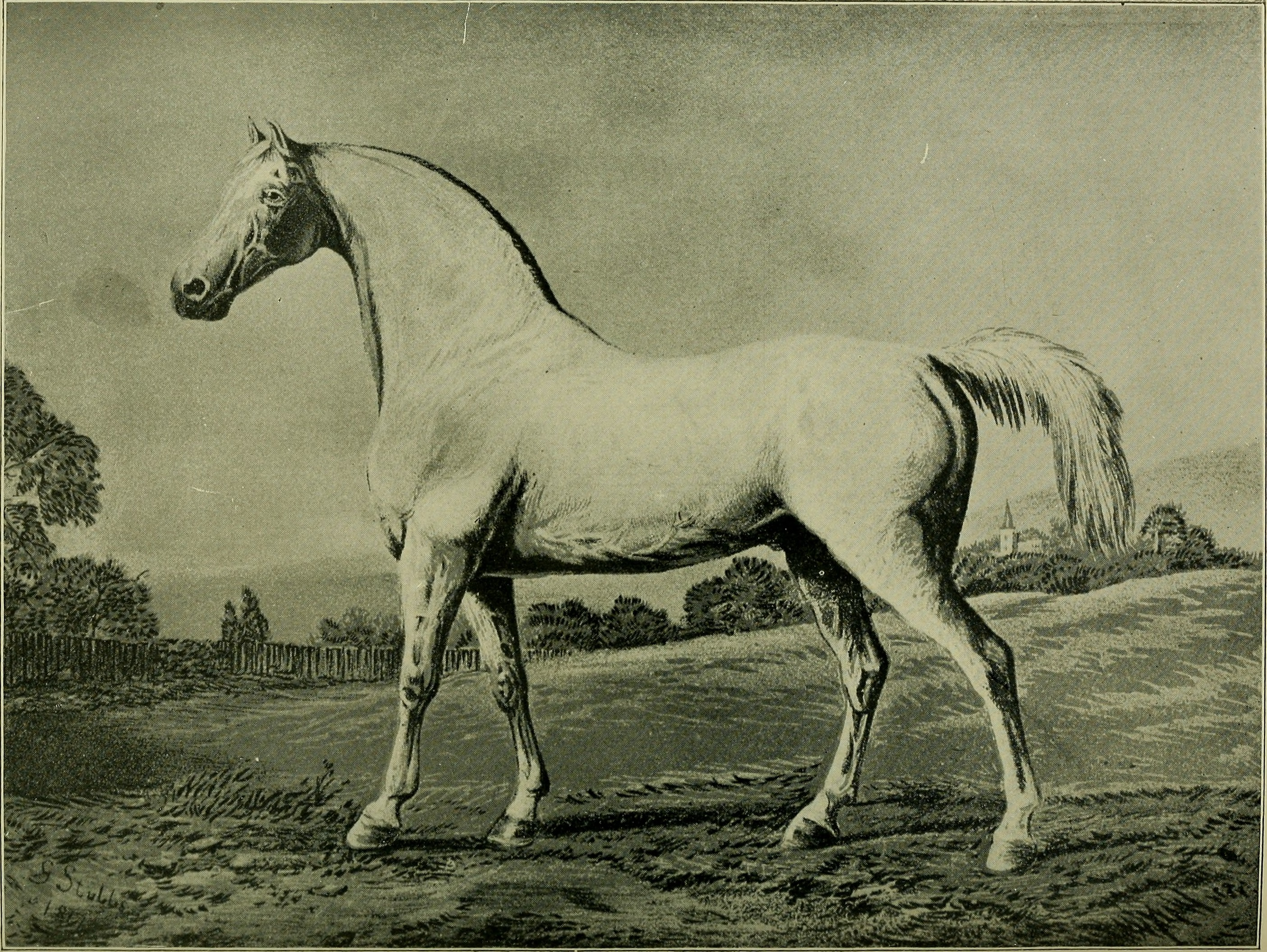
- Portrait of Mambrino
- Breed: Thoroughbred
- Sire: Engineer
- Grandsire: Sampson
- Dam: Cade Mare (Unnamed)
- Damsire: Cade
- Sex: Stallion
- Foaled: 1768
- Country: Great Britain
- Color: Gray
- Breeder: John Atkinson
- Owner: Richard Grosvenor

Mambrino was a grey Thoroughbred racehorse, foaled in 1768, by Engineer, and out of an unnamed mare by Cade.

== Life ==
Mambrino was a grey by Engineer and out of an unnamed mare by Cade. He was bred by John Atkinson of Scholes, Yorkshire. Mambrino was said to look more like a carriage horse rather than a racehorse.

He was sold to and raced for Lord Grosvenor winning the King's Plate and Jockey Club Plate when he was just seven years old. On top of that, he had 11 wins, beating some of the finest horses of his time, including Florizel, Trentham and Comus. He was also noted as a fine trotter and speed in harness racing. Later, Mambrino was retired to Oxford Stud, where he sired hunters, coach horses, road horses, and a couple of runners and broodmares. His most notable is Messenger, who was exported to North America, becoming a foundation sire of the Standardbred harness racing breed. Messenger was also important in the foundation of English Coach horses.

== Sire line tree ==
- Mambrino
  - Messenger
    - Tippoo Saib
      - Financier
    - Potomac
    - Hambletonian
    - Saratoga
      - Dove
    - Mambrino
      - Abdallah
        - Hambletonian 10
        - Conklin's Abdallah
      - Mambrino Paymaster
        - Mambrino Chief
  - Carlo Khan
  - Guildford
