= Lynn Pressman Raymond =

American businessman (c. 1912–2009)

Lynn Pressman Raymond (c. 1912 – July 22, 2009) was an American business executive who joined her husband Jack Pressman in developing and growing the Pressman Toy Corporation, and was an innovator in creating and licensing toys based on hit television programs and professional athletes in her two decades as president of the firm following her husband's death in 1959.

== Early life and career ==
She was born in Woodhaven, Queens as Lynn Rambach, and grew up in Brooklyn, where she graduated from Erasmus Hall High School. Starting as a secretary at Abraham & Straus after completing high school, where she moved up the ladder to higher posts in advertising and training. She moved to McCreery's department store on Fifth Avenue where she moved up to a senior merchandising post. At McCreery's she set up promotional stunts that included having an employee dressed in an usher's uniform carry in with great fanfare to a fashion show a series of empty hat boxes that were said to contain the latest fashions fresh from Paris.

== Pressman Toys ==
Her second marriage was to "Marble King" Jack Pressman in 1942, who had founded the predecessor company in 1922 and had built the business up on the success of his acquisition of the rights to the game Chinese checkers in 1928 which became a nationwide bestseller and was still a mainstay for decades. In the late 1940s he dissolved his partnership with his original partner, and appointed Lynn as vice president of the business her husband reestablished as Pressman Toy Company after she succeeded in convincing her husband to bring her into the business.

Seeing the anxiety of her children on visits to the doctor due to ill health or for vaccinations, she created the Doctor Bag in 1956—which included a stethoscope, syringe and other pretend medical supplies—to help kids deal with their fears. A Nurse Bag followed shortly thereafter, and this was extended with a Ken Doctor Bag and a Barbie Nurse Bag licensed in 1962. With the rise of The Mickey Mouse Club, first broadcast in 1955, a series of toys were licensed from the Walt Disney Company, including Mouskatennis table tennis, a Mickey Mouse Counting Jump Rope and Fun Tray, a board game based on the Davy Crockett television series and other toys inspired by Disney. Other games featured tie-ins to the Lone Ranger and Superman.

Jack Pressman's deteriorating health led Lynn to assume more responsibility in managing the firm, and she took over as president following his death in 1959. She had all of her company's toys made in the United States and set up a policy prohibiting sale of rifles and other military gear at a time when toy guns were a childhood staple, stating in the mid-1960s that "under no circumstances will I ever knowingly manufacture a bayonet, a hand grenade or any of the dreadful weapons that can destroy life as playthings for children". As a woman running a company, she received the cold shoulder from the bank her husband had dealt with, but was able to get by with credit from a bank located in her building.

She used her fashion sense and marketing skills to create more appealing packaging for games and was an early user of television to advertise the firm's products. She had a knack for understanding games offered to the firm and offering ways to simplify and improve game play. She brought in an elephant in front of the Toy Center at 23rd Street and Broadway for the annual toy fair to promote two new memory games. She signed Roger Maris at the height of his fame to promote Pressman's Big League Action Baseball, later signing Tom Seaver and Carl Yastrzemski.

Inspired by a letter from the anti-war Westchester Women's International League for Peace and Freedom, Raymond oversaw the creation of a series of Pen Pal Dolls, each approved by UNICEF, which included a pen, stationery and information about the doll's country including a simple dictionary, with the name and address of a girl in one of 20 countries around the world.

== Personal ==
Raymond described herself as having "bad hair" and was a big fan of wearing distinctive hats from among the hundreds of designs she owned that were created by milliner Mr. John.

A resident of Manhattan's Upper East Side near the Whitney Museum of American Art, Raymond died at her apartment at age 97 on July 22, 2009. She was survived by a daughter from her first marriage (which had ended in divorce) and two sons from her marriage to Jack Pressman, as well as five grandchildren and two great-grandchildren. Jack Pressman died in 1959; her marriage to Dr. Martin Gray ended with his death in 1970, and her fourth husband, Michael Raymond died in the 1990s.

She played minor roles in a number of films produced by her son Edward R. Pressman, including in his 1987 film Wall Street. She was hired for a Juicy Couture print ad when she was 94 years old. Her son James Pressman succeeded her as the company's president in 1979.
