= Qi Shu Fang =

Peking opera performer

Qi Shu Fang 齊淑芳
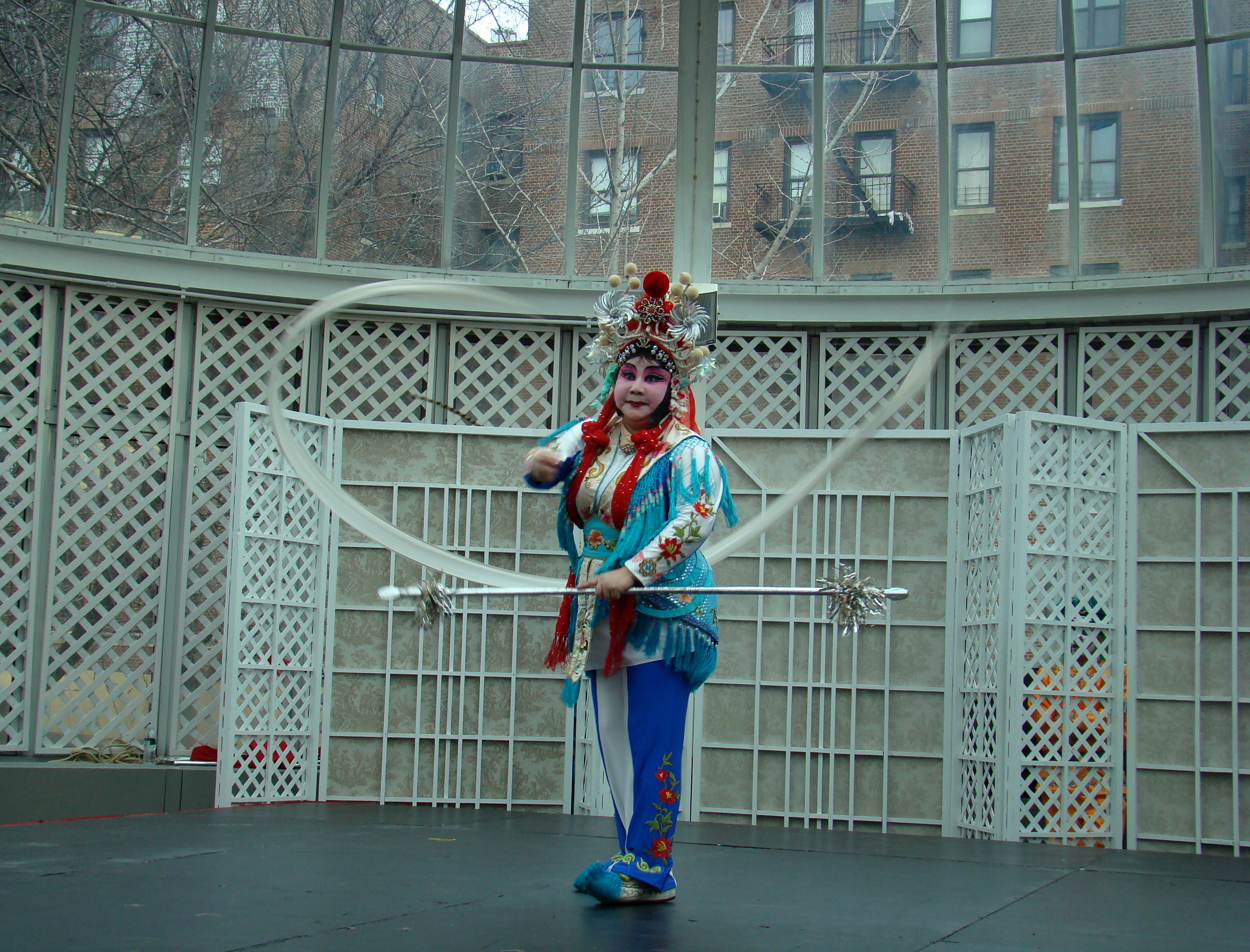
- Qi performs at the Brooklyn Botanical Garden in 2009.

Background information
- Born: 1943 (age 82–83); Shanghai, China
- Genre: Peking opera
- Occupation: Performer
- Years active: 1961–present

Qi Shu Fang (born 1943, Chinese: 齊淑芳; pinyin: Qí Shū Fāng) is a Chinese-born American performer of Peking opera.

A native of Shanghai, Qi was born into an acting family, and began studying Peking opera when she was four. Later she enrolled in the Shanghai Theater School, and upon graduation was admitted to membership in the new Shanghai Youth Peking Drama Troupe. At 18, she was chosen by Jiang Qing to perform the female lead in one of the government's revolutionary operas. At 22, her talent was once again recognized by the government when she was among those selected to perform revolutionary operas during the Cultural Revolution; during this time she gained acclaim throughout the country, her facility in martial arts combining with her acting and singing abilities to establish her popularity. With the loosening of restrictions on the performance of traditional works in the late 1970s, she broadened her repertory to include several of these pieces. In 1987 she emigrated to the United States, settling with her husband, Ding Mei Kui, in Woodhaven, Queens, New York City. With him, and along with a number of other performers, she founded the Qi Shu Fang Peking Opera Company in 1988. She has continued to perform worldwide.

Qi was awarded a National Heritage Fellowship by the National Endowment for the Arts in 2001 for her work in carrying on the traditions of Peking opera. In her home country she has been named a National Treasure of China. Two portrait photographs of her by Alan Govenar, one in costume and one in street attire, are owned by the National Portrait Gallery of the Smithsonian Institution.
