= Neir's Tavern =

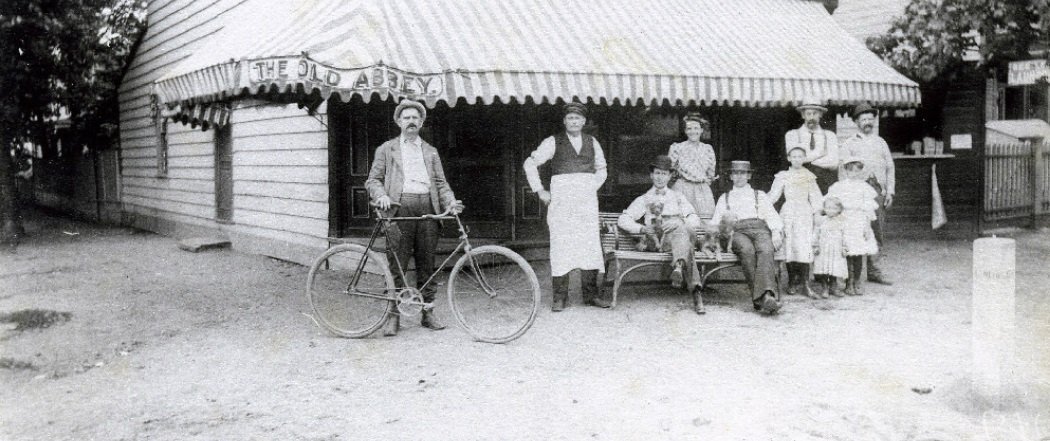
- Neir's (then The Old Abbey) in the 19th century

- Location of Neir's Tavern in New York City

Restaurant information
- Established: 1829
- Owner: Loycent Gordon
- Food type: Pub, American steakhouse
- Dress code: Casual
- Location: 87-48 78th Street, New York City, Queens, New York, 11421, USA
- Coordinates: 40.689814°N 73.863360°W
- Website: neirstavern.com

Neir's Tavern is a bar located at 87-48 78th Street in the Woodhaven neighborhood of Queens, New York City. It is one of the oldest bars in the United States, having been in nearly continuous operation since 1829.

== History ==
=== Original operation ===
The bar was founded in 1829 and, according to the current owner, is one of the oldest bars in the country, having been in continuous operation since 1829 (even during Prohibition), under various names such as Blue Pump Room, Old Abbey, Neir’s Social Hall, and Union Course Tavern. Local historians noted that it was during Prohibition that it became a speakeasy. The bar was founded near the Union Course racetrack (extant 1821–1888) and hosted many track patrons during the track's existence. The establishment was owned by the Neir family from 1898 to 1967, after which it went into decline and was ready to close down in 2009, but was saved in the eleventh hour when purchased by new owners. At various times in its history, it featured a ballroom, hotel rooms and a bowling alley.

=== New management ===
The bar, which in 2009 was in deep disrepair, was taken over by David Eng, a music producer who purchased the building in the late 1980s to build a new home for recording studio, Bayside Sound, which was established in 1979 and recorded some of the top acts of the time. Eng also was instrumental in leasing the space for the filming of the movies Goodfellas and Tower Heist. He saw great promise in the bar and enlisted the assistance of his friends, Loycent Gordon and Alex Ewen, both of whom also worked in the music industry. The trio joined together as business partners and later invited drummer, Andy Bigan, to become the 4th partner. This innovative team spearheaded the major refurbishment of the historic establishment that followed, including careful restoration of the beautiful, 150-year-old mahogany bar and the installation of a kitchen which served a small selection of dinner entrees as well as pub fare. Authentically returned to its former glory, the bar re-opened in 2010 and served as a place to showcase new musical talent. Today it is owned by FDNY Lieutenant Loycent Gordon, but the building is owned by others. According to the Queens Chronicle, the restored mahogany bar was originally installed "when Ulysses S. Grant was in the White House."

The Neir's 190 Committee was formed in 2019, the bar's 190th anniversary, to preserve the tavern. In early 2020, it was announced that Neir’s Tavern would close on January 12 because the rent imposed by the new landlord was too high. In response, public officials vowed to take action, and Gordon called the radio show hosted by New York City mayor Bill de Blasio. Three days before the closure was set to take effect, de Blasio and the Queens Chamber of Commerce negotiated an agreement with the landlords that would allow Neir's to stay. The city also gave a $90,000 grant to the tavern.

Neir's hosts local fundraisers, including food drives and collections, throughout the year. Every October, there is a block party to celebrate the anniversary of Neir's on its "Road to 200" (years); its bicentennial will be celebrated in 2029. Having saved Neir's Tavern not just once in 2009, but again in 2020, owner Loycent Gordon has proclaimed that "Community conquers all!"

== Preservation ==
Woodhaven residents and other preservationists have unsuccessfully petitioned the City of New York to grant the tavern official status as a New York City Landmarks Preservation Commission. Gordon points to the city's failure to bestow landmark status on the bar as evidence of "the oligarchy of the Manhattan-centric system." Locals have rallied around the bar after the sale of the building in December 2018 to an LLC whose managers reportedly professed unawareness of the bar's history. A local resident and Woodhaven booster has said, "I do a lot of walking tours and I’m sick of saying, 'This is where something used to be.' [...] I don’t ever want to say 'That's where Neir’s Tavern used to be.'"

== In literature and the arts ==
Scenes from the film Goodfellas were shot in the bar (14% of the film is set in Neirs), as were scenes from Tower Heist. According to local legend, the gangsters portrayed in the film Goodfellas did actually gather at Neirs. It attracts tourists due to its connection with the movie, and its history. Anthony Bourdain visited Neir's in 2017 and featured Neir's on his show Parts Unknown.

According to some sources, Mae West made her first professional appearances here, although other sources dispute this as unconfirmed legend. Neir's Tavern itself avers the Mae West connection. Neir's offers a cocktail called "Mae West Punch".

== Gallery ==
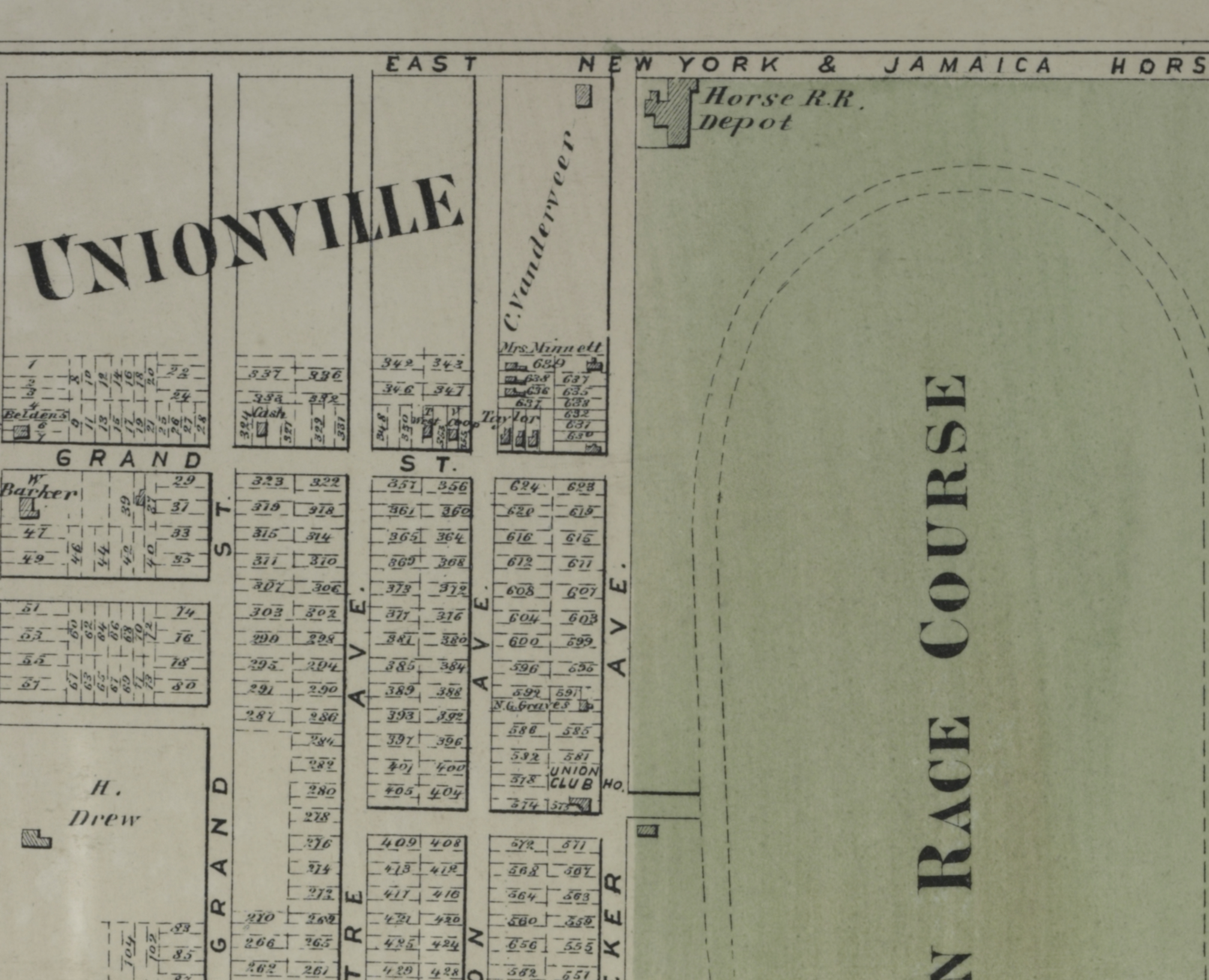
Union Race Course detail

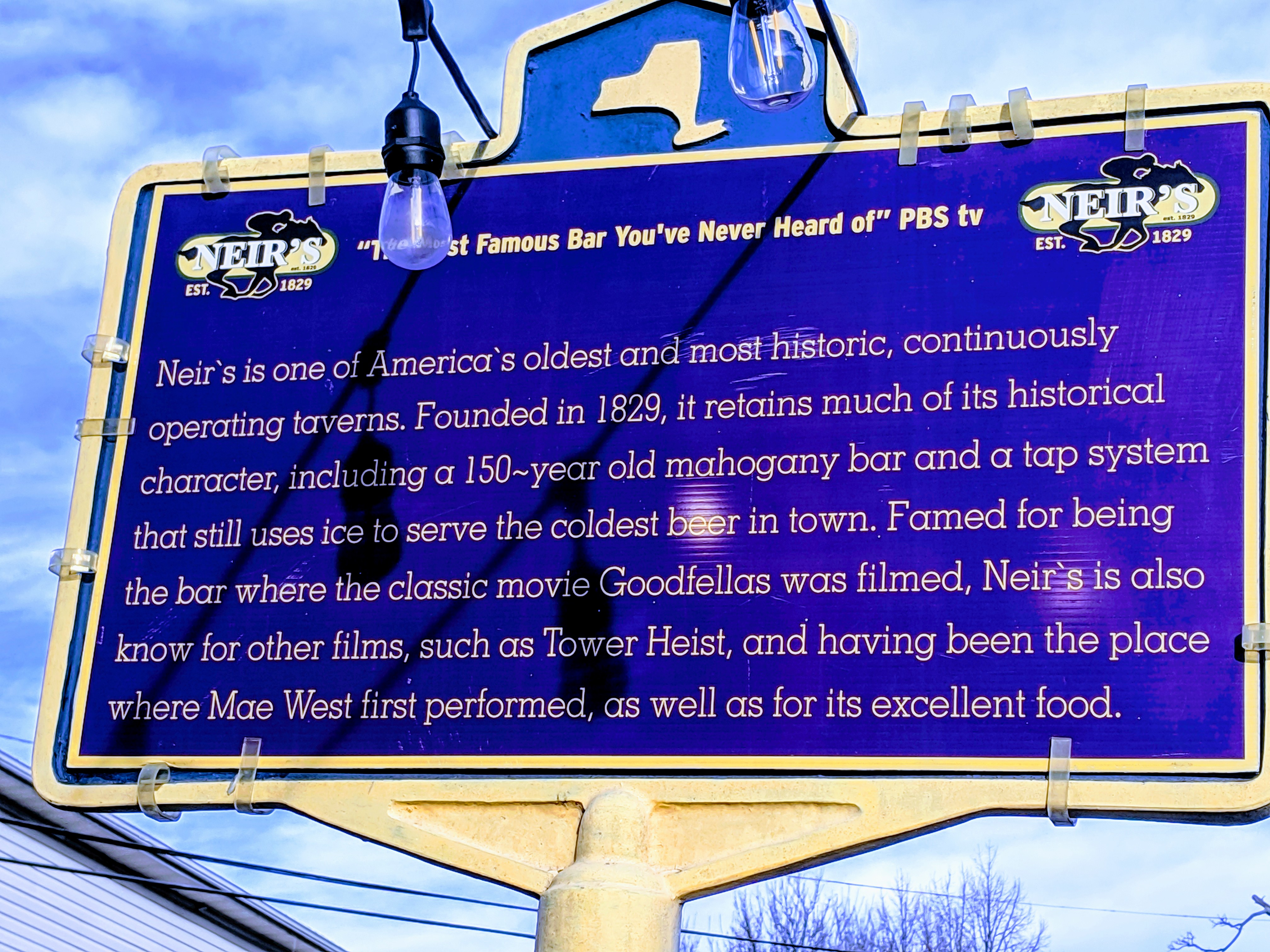
Historical marker 2019

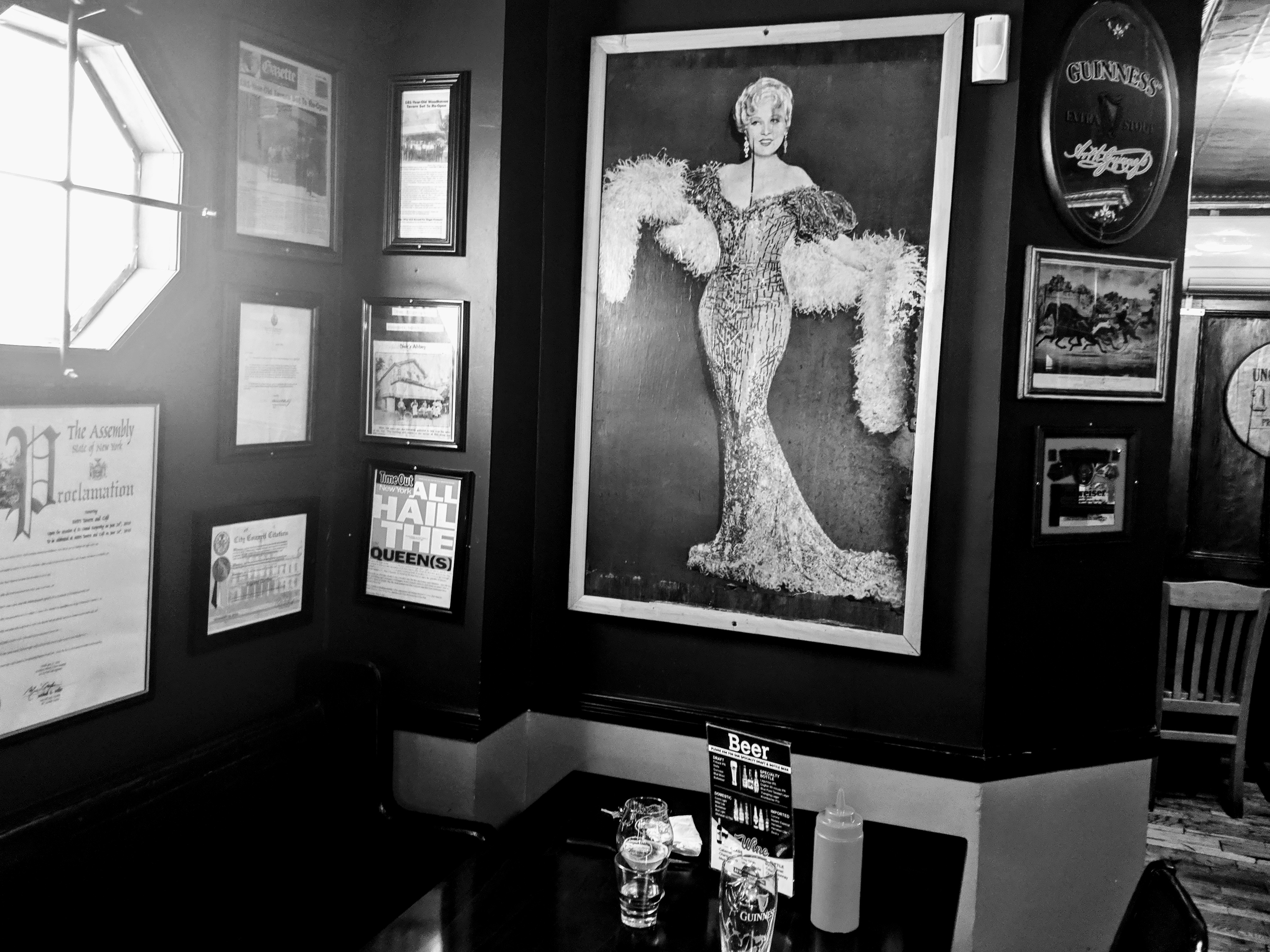
Mae West tribute alcove 2019
