= Wyckoff-Snediker Family Cemetery =

Historic cemetery in New York, United States

- U.S. National Register of Historic Places
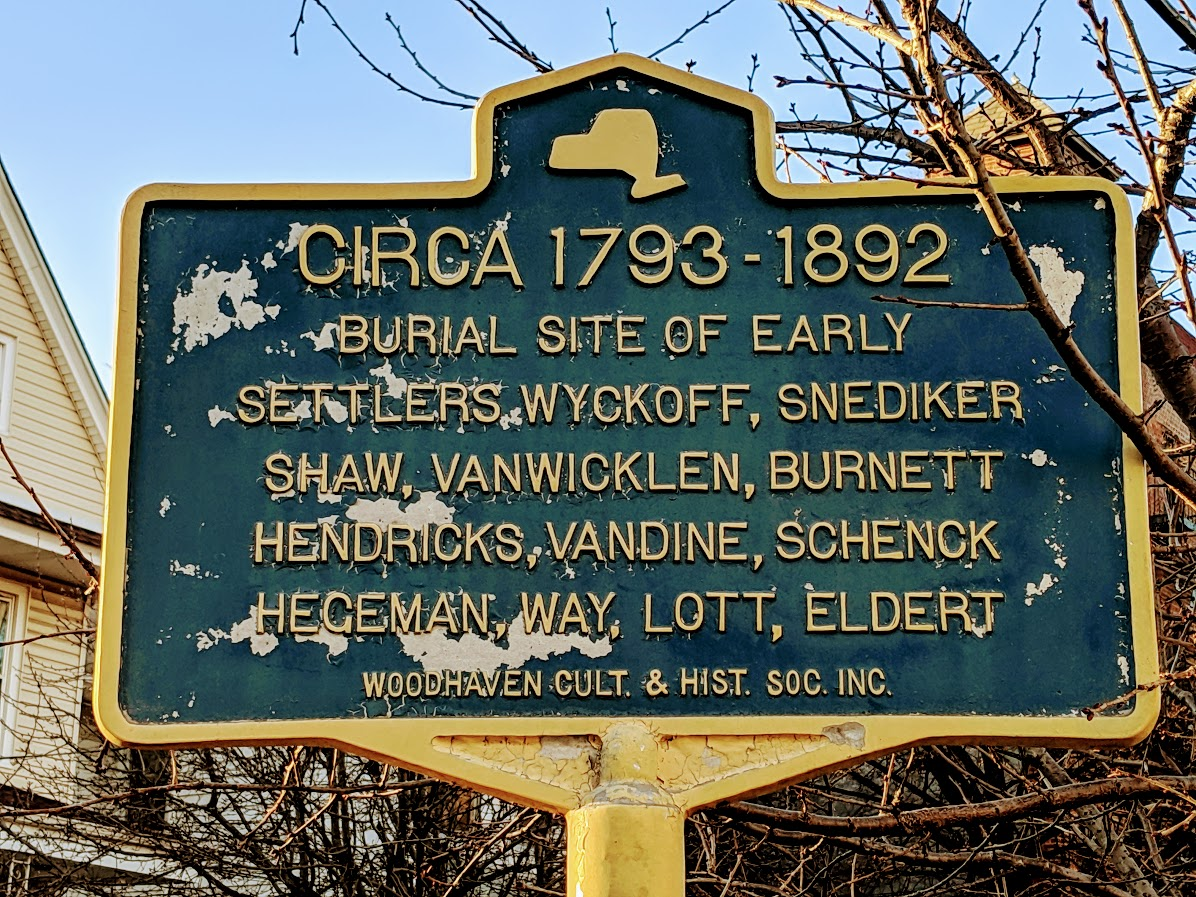
- Marker in front of All Saints church

- Location within New York City Location within New York Location within the United States
- Location: 85-45 96th St., Woodhaven, New York
- Coordinates: 40°41′46″N 73°50′57″W
- Area: 0.5 acres (0.20 ha)
- Built: 1736
- NRHP reference No.: 01000549
- Added to NRHP: May 25, 2001

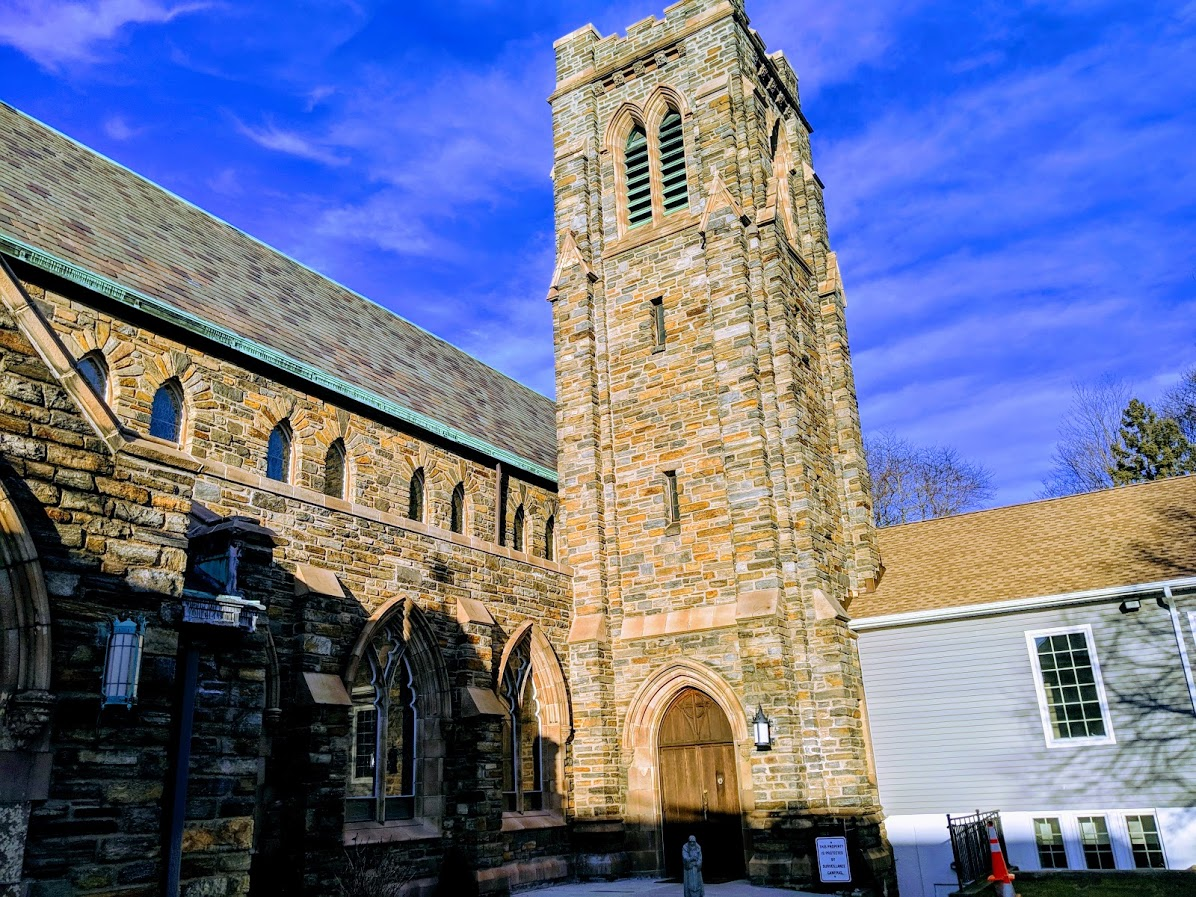
All Saints Episcopal Church

Wyckoff-Snediker Family Cemetery is a historic cemetery located in the Woodhaven section of the New York City borough of Queens. It is located behind St. Matthew's Episcopal Church which closed in 2011. All Saints Congregation undertook renovations which were completed in 2018. It has grave markers that denote burials dating from 1793 to 1892. The cemetery includes 136 members of the Wyckoff and Snediker families, as well as other local Dutch families.

It was listed on the National Register of Historic Places in 2001.
