= Union Course =

Horse racing course in Queens, New York

Coordinates: 40°41′20.88″N 73°51′38.29″W

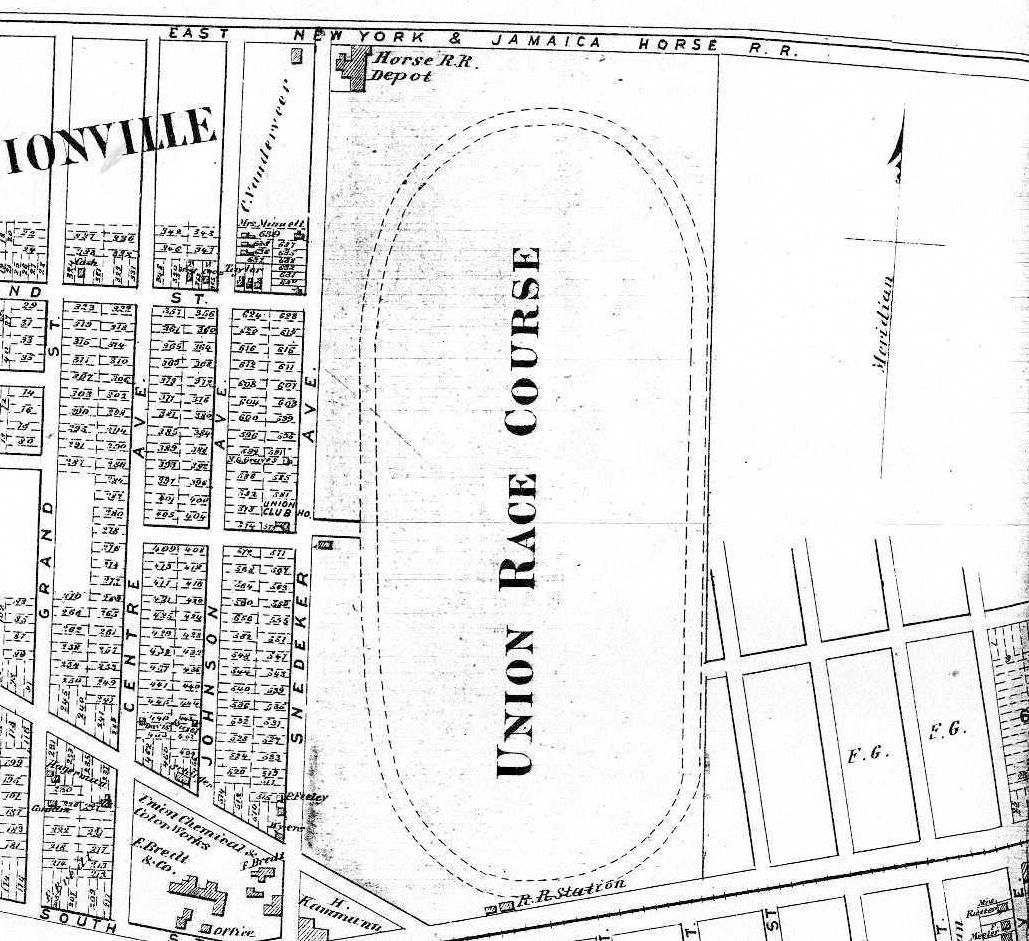
- 1873 Map showing Union Course. Snedeker Ave. is now 78th Street.
- Interactive map of Union Course
- Location: Queens, New York City
- Date opened: 1821

Union Course was a horse racing course in what is now Woodhaven, Queens, New York City. It hosted some of the most famous horse races in American history, including the 1823 match between American Eclipse and Sir Henry. The track was located between what are now Jamaica Avenue on the north, Atlantic Avenue on the south, 78th Street on the west, and 85th Street on the east.

== Background ==
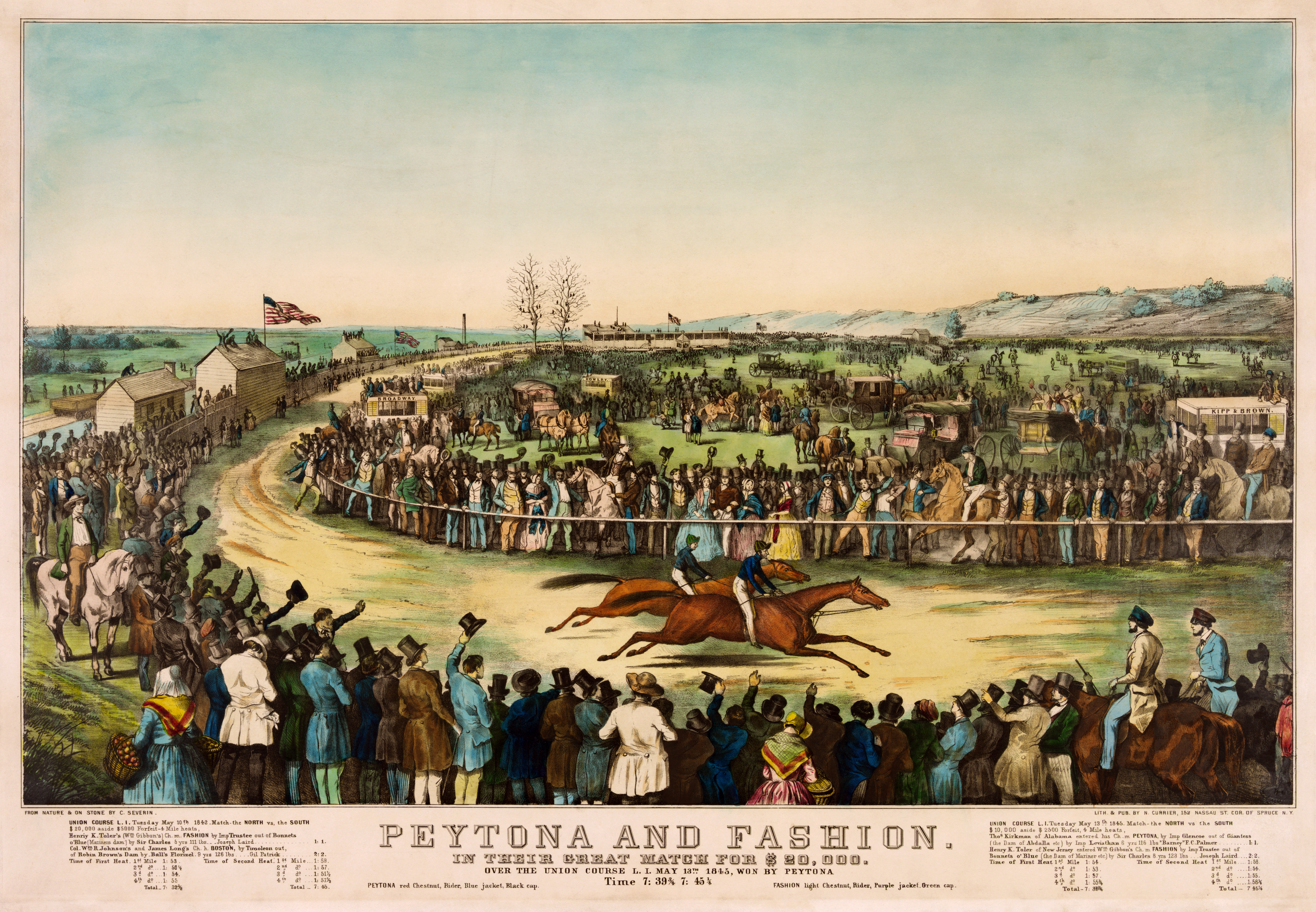
"Fashion meets Peytona" in 1845

Although horse races (and betting on them) had enjoyed popularity in New York prior to the American Revolution, the sport fell out of favor in the northern part of country after the war, and was seen as fostering immoral behavior. In 1802, the New York State legislature passed an "Act to Prevent Horse-Racing" and banned the sport altogether. In 1820, the "New York Association for the Improvement of the Breed of Horses" (NYAIBH) was founded by John Cox Stevens and Cornelius W. Van Ranst, among others, and successfully pushed to repeal the ban. In 1821, New York approved a limited bill allowing races only in May and October, and only in Queens. Not coincidentally, NYAIBH had already purchased land in Jamaica on the western border of Queens with Brooklyn. The first races were held on October 15, 1821, when Lady Lightfoot (from North Carolina) suffered one of her few losses to the famed American Eclipse.

Union Course was a nationally famous racetrack situated in the area now bounded by 78th Street, 85th Street, Jamaica Avenue, and Atlantic Avenue. The Union Course was the first skinned — or dirt — racing surface, a curious novelty at the time. The course was originally without grandstands. The custom of conducting a single, four-mile (6 km) race consisting of as many heats as were necessary to determine a winner, gave way to programs consisting of several races. Match races between horses from the South against those from the North drew crowds as high as 70,000. The Brooklyn and Jamaica Rail Road (later, the Long Island Rail Road) built a station nearby, which it named Union Course, which also became the name of the surrounding neighborhood. Several hotels (including the Snedeker Hotel and the Forschback Inn) were built in the area to accommodate the racing crowds.

In the 1823 match set up by John Cox Stevens, American Eclipse (representing the North) raced Henry (representing the South). Eclipse won the best-of-three heats competition. 60,000 spectators watched.

In the 1830s, likely 1837, the Union Course became the first racecourse in America to have beveled turns, turned up on the outside, thus increasing speed on the course.

The popularity of match races at Union Course gradually declined; after 1851, trotting races became the main attraction. Sold in 1872, by 1888 the course was subdivided into building lots for new housing.

== See also ==
- Neir's Tavern – an associated tavern
