= St. Matthew's Episcopal Church (Queens) =

- U.S. National Register of Historic Places
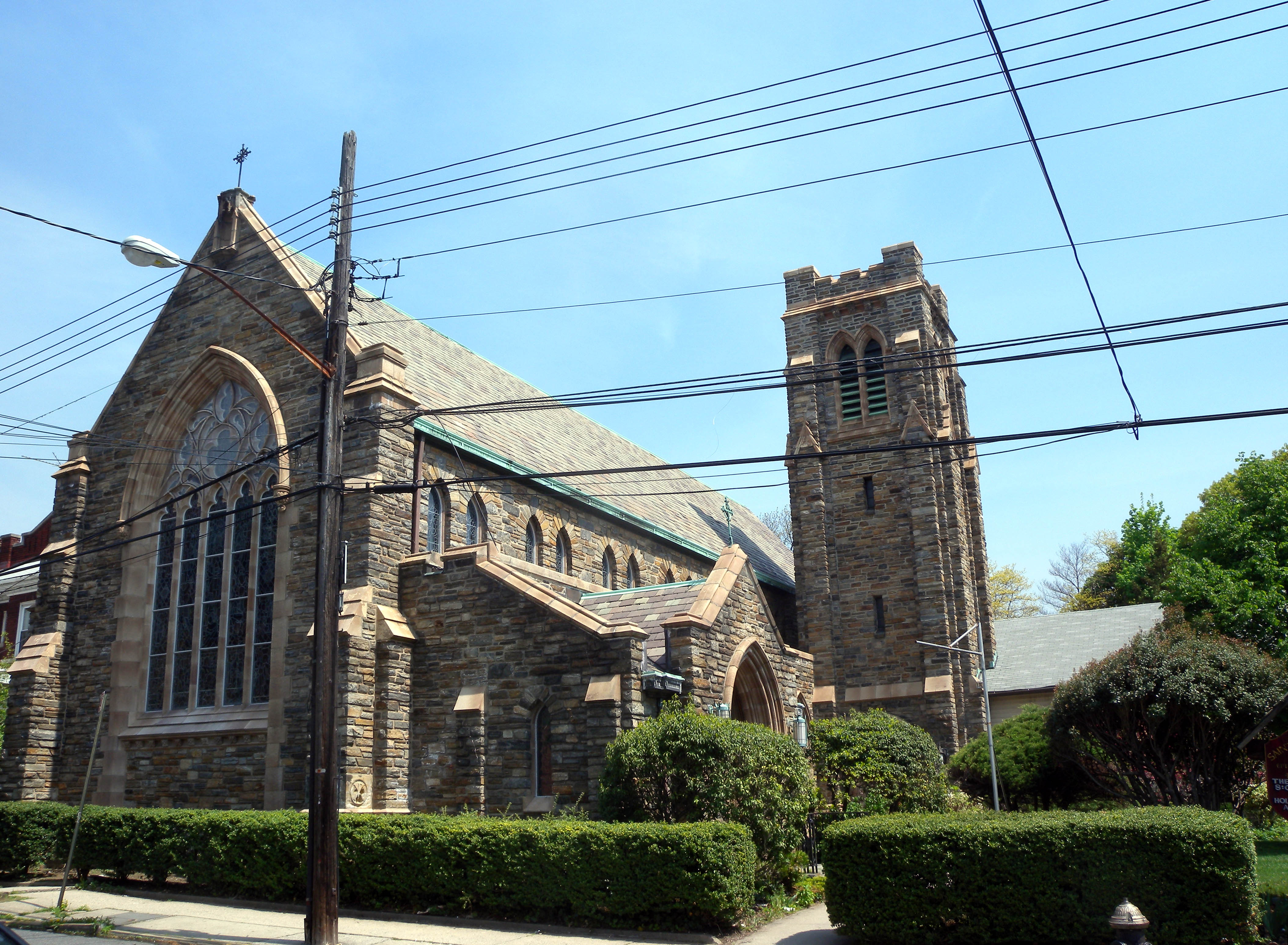

- Location within New York City Location within New York Location within the United States
- Location: 85-45 96th St., Woodhaven, New York
- Coordinates: 40°41′46″N 73°50′58″W
- Area: 0.3 acres (0.12 ha)
- Built: 1907
- Architect: Schirmer, Robert F.; Bereau, Henry
- Architectural style: Late Gothic Revival
- NRHP reference No.: 01000550
- Added to NRHP: May 25, 2001

St. Matthew's Episcopal Church, also known as St. Matthew's Episcopal Church and Close, is a historic Episcopal church at 85-45 96th Street in Woodhaven, Queens, New York. Located behind the church is the Wyckoff-Snediker Family Cemetery.

== History ==
The parish hall dates to 1907. The church was built between 1926 and 1927 in the Late Gothic Revival style, designed by the architect Robert F. Schirmer. It was listed on the National Register of Historic Places in 2001.

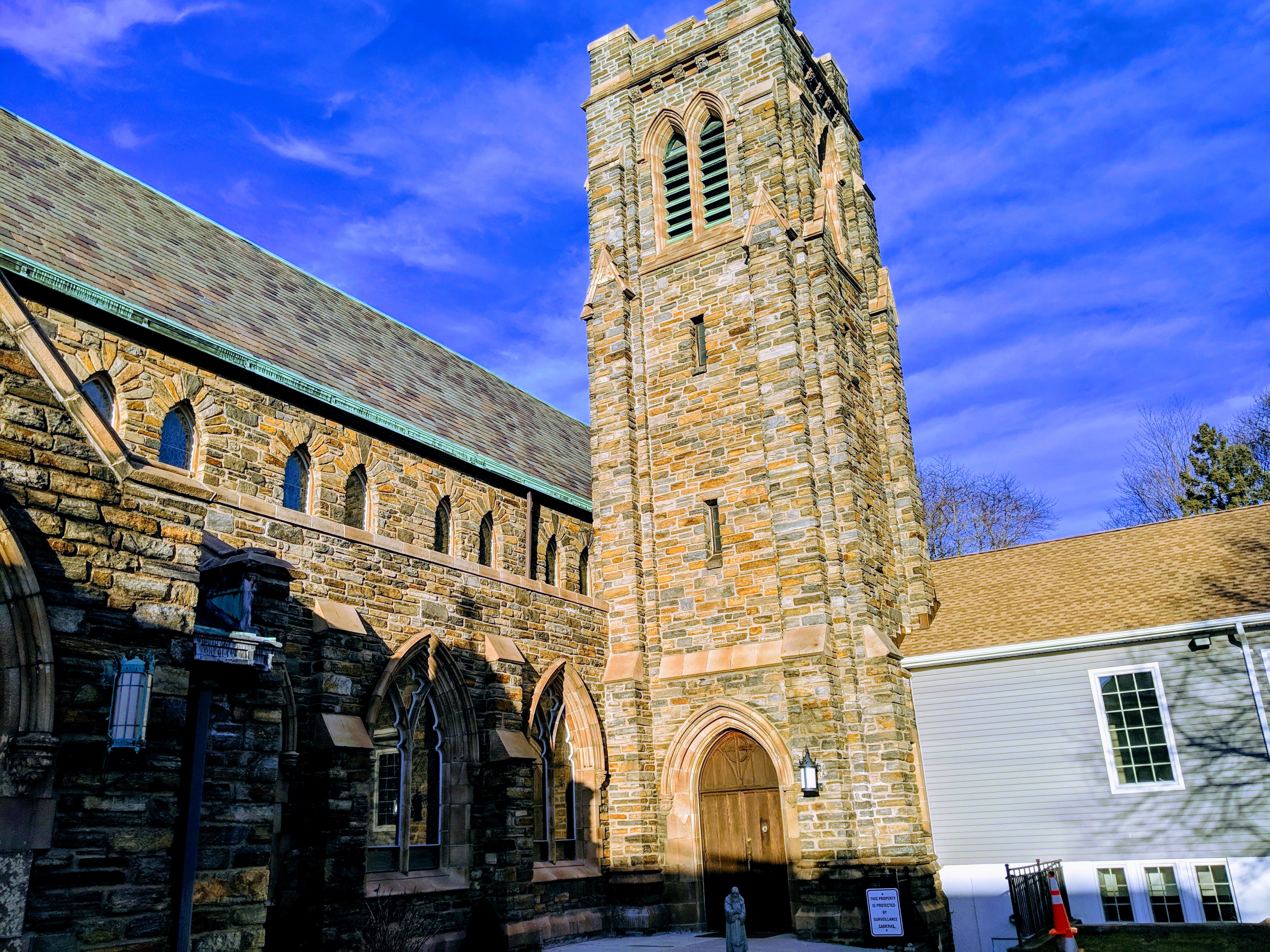
St. Matthews steeple

The original building(1901–1928) had an organ of an unknown brand. The congregation had moved from a storefront on 91st street and Jamaica avenue in 1901 to the small wooden church on 96th street. The first permanent building was the parish hall, which was completed in 1907. The second building was a permanent stone structure which was designed in the Gothic Revival style by Architect Henry Bereau and was completed in 1928. The cornerstone was laid the previous March; and the first service was held December 2, 1928, which is the genesis of the church. The first organ was by Henry Pilcher's Sons, Op. 1425 (1928), an Electro-Pneumatic with 11 ranks and two manuals. It was replaced in 1988 by the Reuter Organ Company of Lawrence, Kan., with Op. 2103, an Electro-Pneumatic with 10 ranks, 2 manuals and 35 stops.

== Cemetery ==
In the 1960s, the church bought the Wyckoff-Snediker Family Cemetery which was behind the church buildings. It has about 160 gravestones from the 18th and 19th century. The church and cemetery were both placed on the National Register of Historic Places in 2001.

== All Saints ==
St. Matthew's closed on May 22, 2011. In October 2013, the congregation of All Saints Episcopal Church in Richmond Hill moved into the St. Matthew's church building and began renovating it and the historic cemetery in back. It is now called All Saints Church.

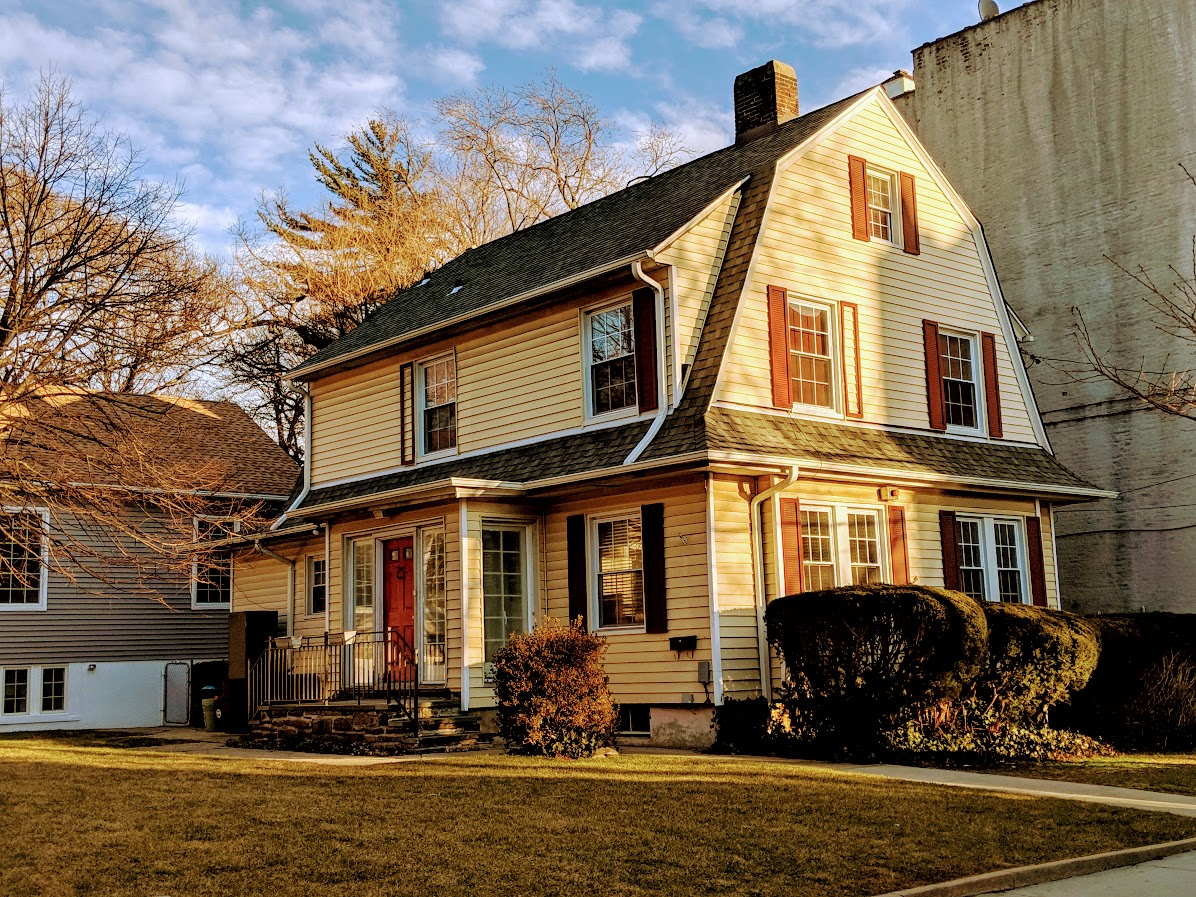
Church Rectory

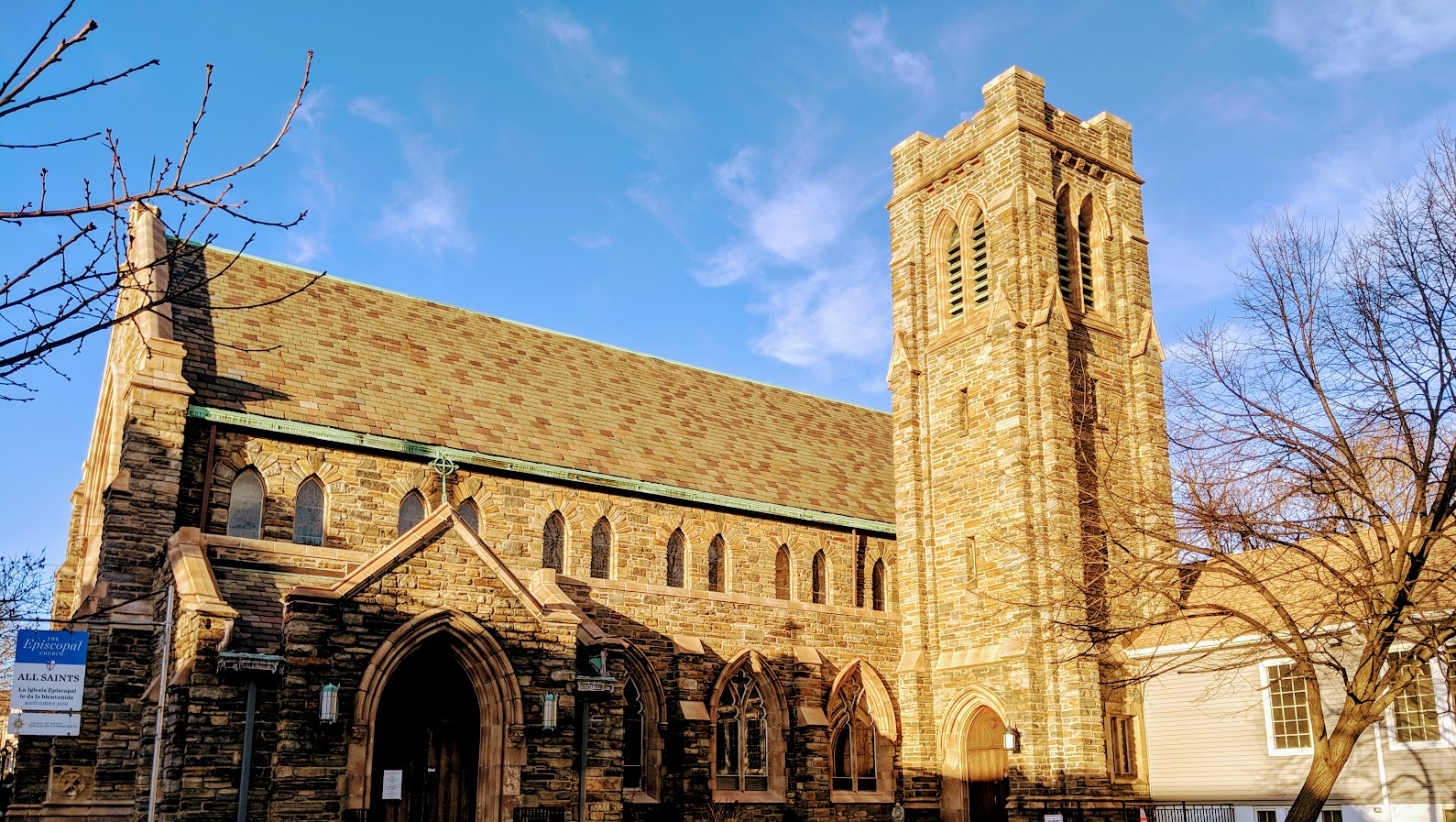
South side

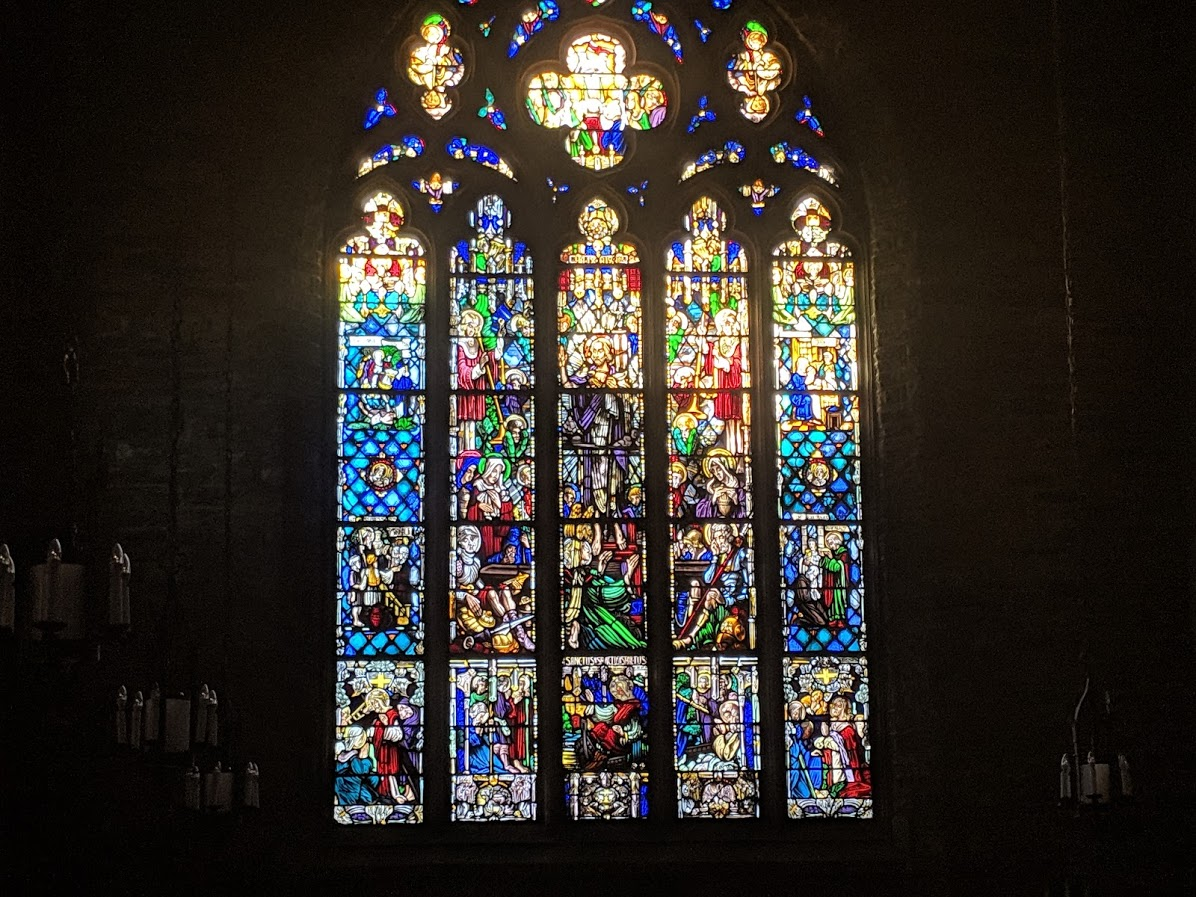
Stained glass diorama

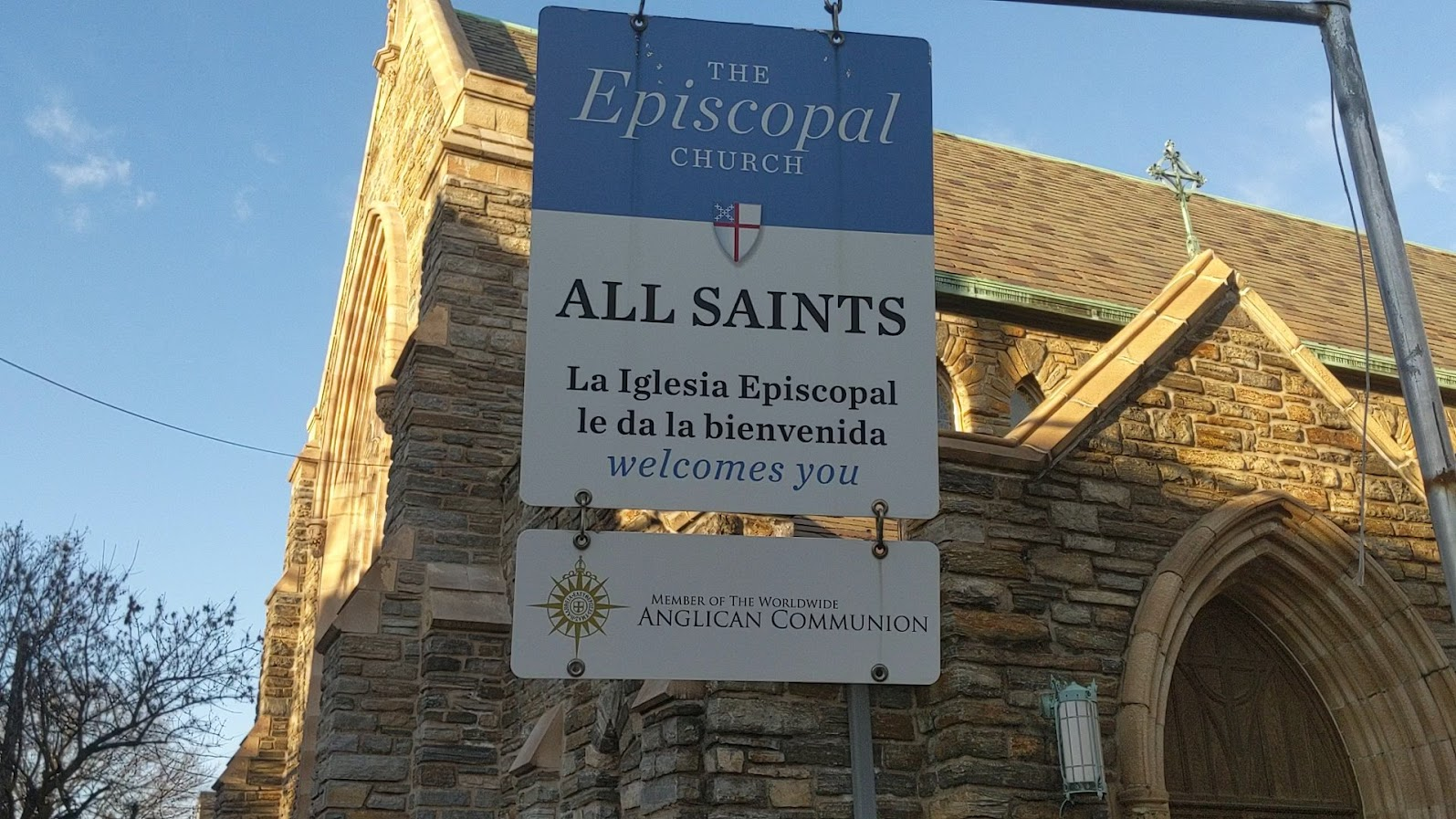
All Saints Episcopal Church sign

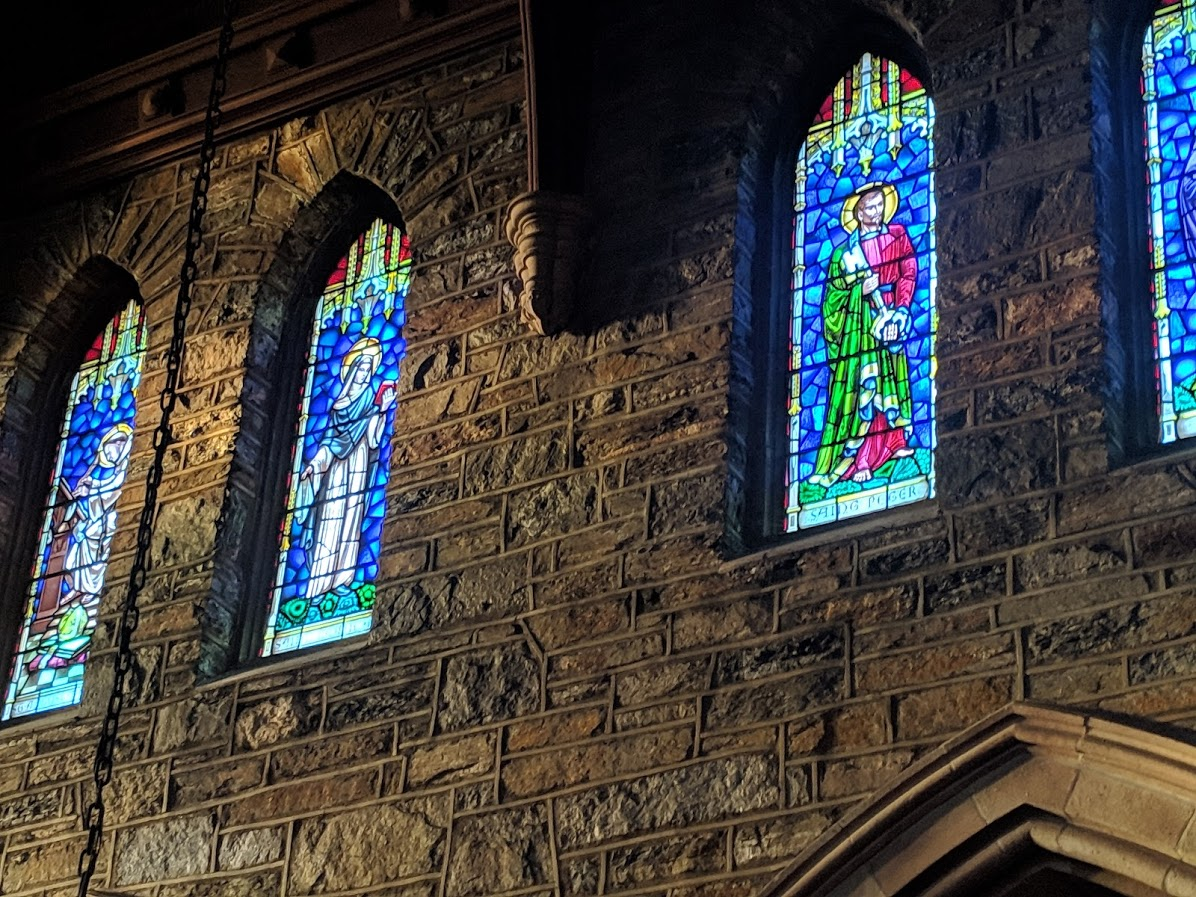
St. Matthew's Episcopal Church (Queens)

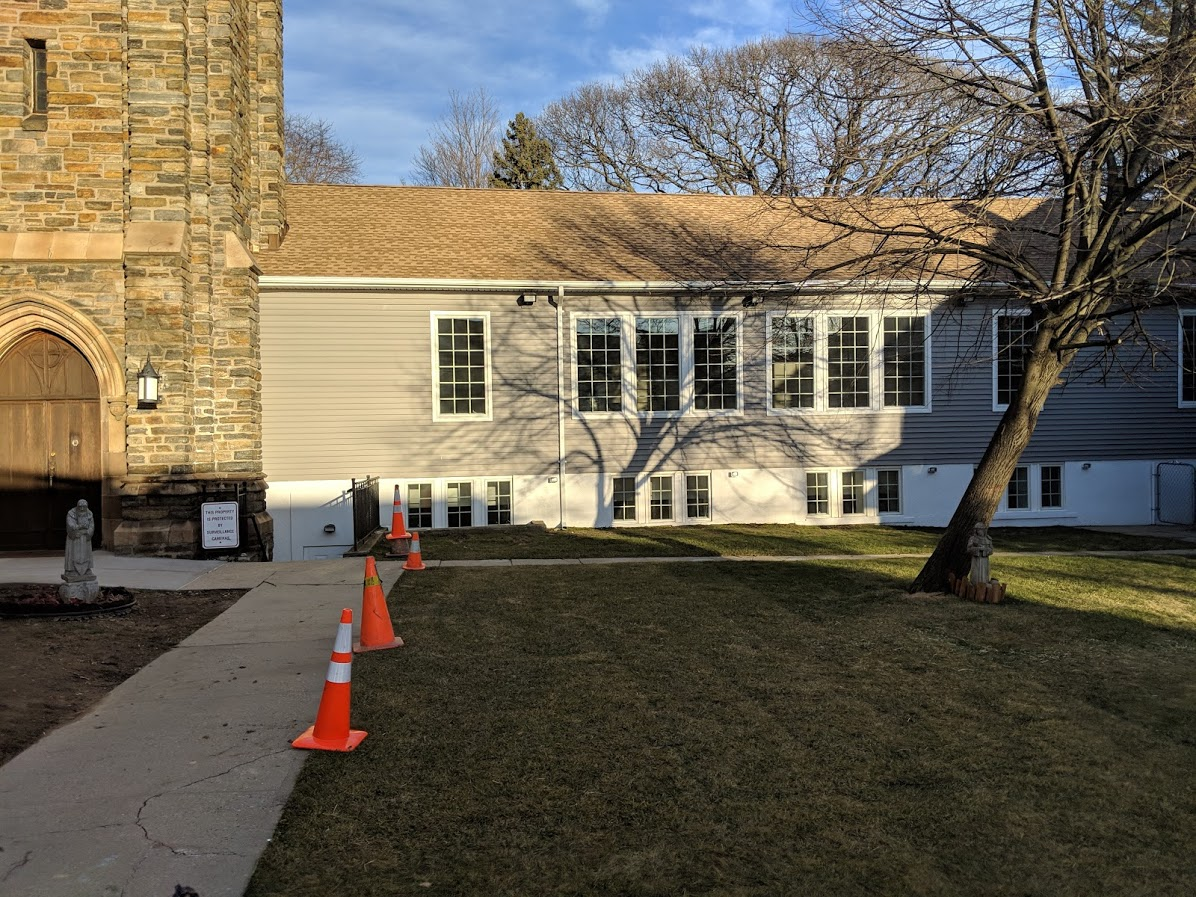
St. Matthew's Episcopal Church (Queens)

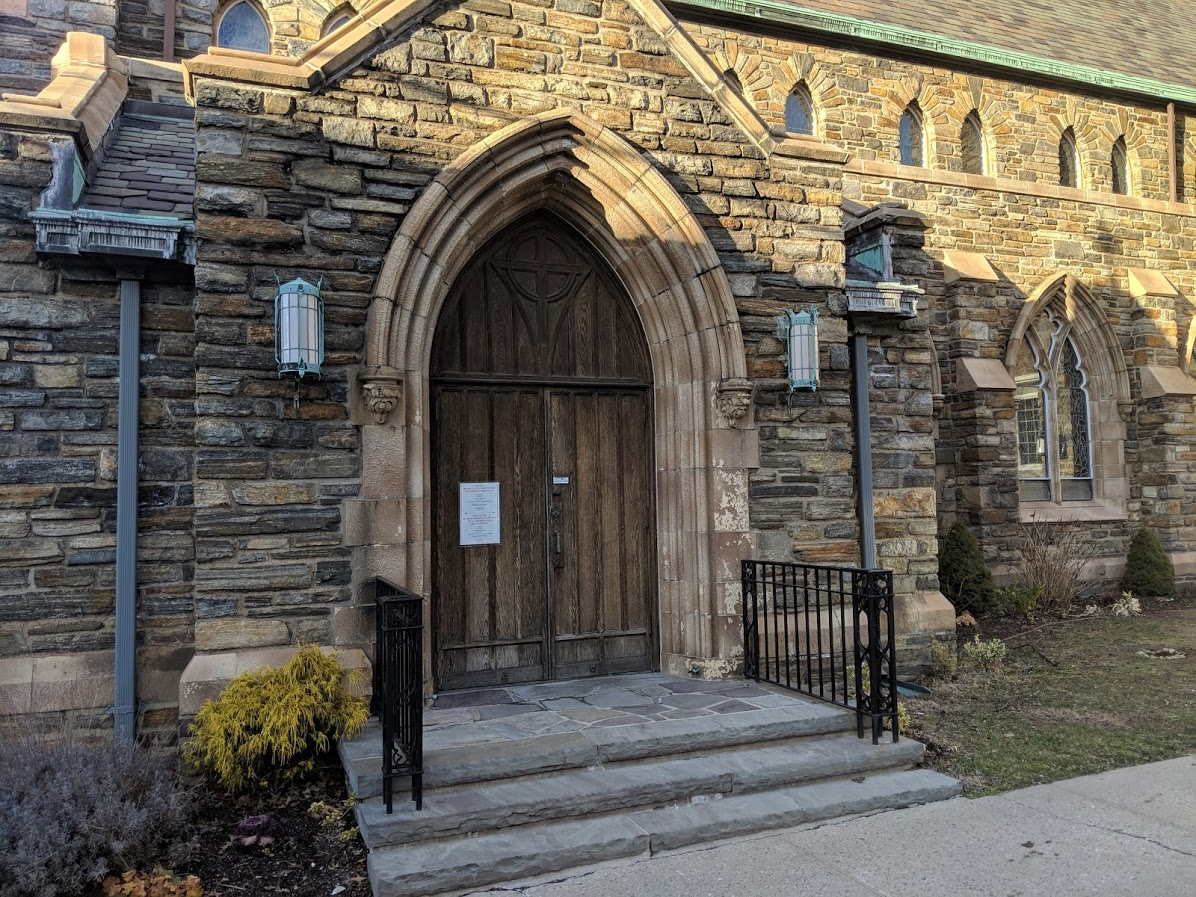
South door
