= Pressman Toy Corporation =

American toy manufacturer

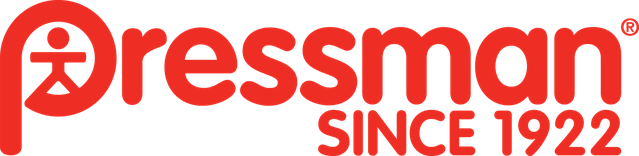
- Company type: Subsidiary of Goliath Games
- Founded: 1922
- Headquarters: Richardson, Texas, United States
- Area served: North America
- Key people: James Pressman; President and CEO
- Products: Family games
- Number of employees: 1,600
- Parent: Goliath Games
- Website: pressmantoy.com

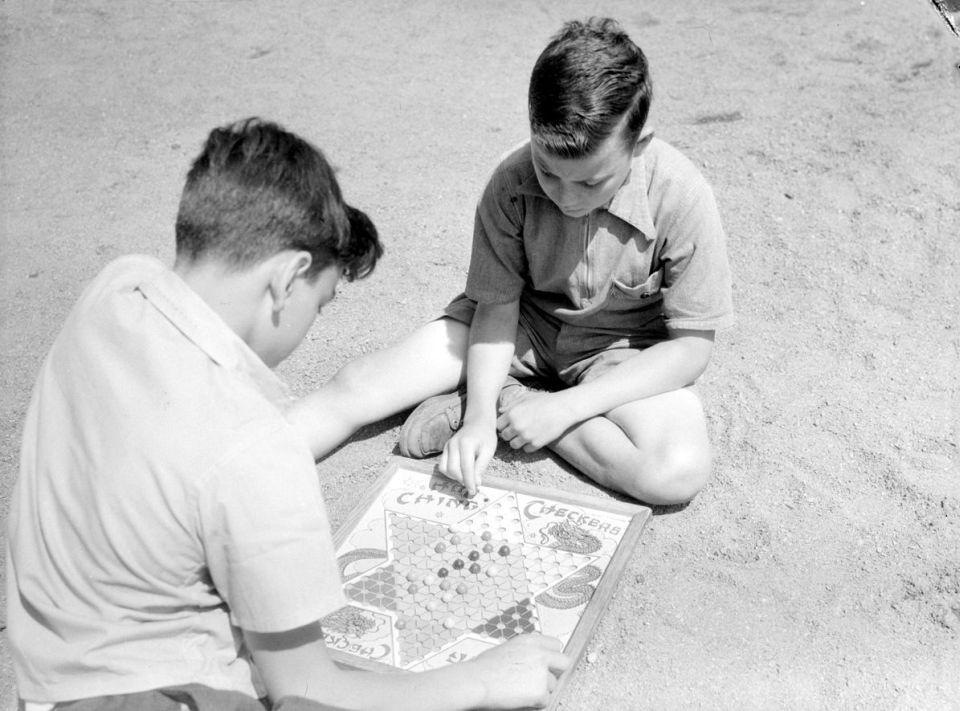
Two boys playing "Hop Ching Checkers" (Chinese checkers) at a summer camp, Montreal, July 1942

Pressman Toy Corporation is a toy manufacturer based in Richardson, Texas. Founded in 1922 by Jack Pressman, it currently focuses on family games and licensed products.

== History ==
Jack Pressman founded the company in 1922 in Brooklyn, New York. Pressman brought in Max Eibitz as a partner in 1925, with Pressman doing sales and Eibitz managing the firm's Brooklyn factory. One of the company's first hits was Chinese checkers, a game that Pressman acquired the rights to in 1928 after spotting the game on a trip to Colorado, and first marketed as "Hop Ching Checkers".

The company was an innovator in licensing games and toys from popular media, such as the Little Orphan Annie and Dick Tracy comic strips. After the release of Walt Disney's first full-length animated feature Snow White and the Seven Dwarfs in 1937, Pressman released a series of Snow White toys based on the film.

Pressman and Eibitz ended their partnership in 1947. Pressman reincorporated later that year as Pressman Toy Company and brought in his wife, Lynn Pressman (née Raymond), who had held senior positions in New York City department stores, as the new company's executive vice president. As Jack Pressman's health deteriorated, she took a greater role in the operation of the firm, and served as its president following his death in 1959.

The 1950s brought the Doctor Bag, designed to help children feel more comfortable with visits to the doctor, which was followed by a Nurse Bag and corresponding Ken and Barbie versions licensed in 1962. A series of items were licensed from Walt Disney Productions, starting after the debut of The Mickey Mouse Club television series in 1955. Lynn Pressman oversaw the signing of baseball star Roger Maris to promote the company's Big League Action Baseball, and later signed Tom Seaver of the New York Mets and Carl Yastrzemski of the Boston Red Sox to represent the product.

Inspired by a letter from the anti-war Westchester Women's International League for Peace and Freedom, Raymond oversaw the creation of a series of Pen Pal Dolls, each approved by UNICEF, which included a pen, stationery and information about the doll's country including a simple dictionary, with the name and address of a girl in one of 20 countries around the world.

James Pressman, son of Jack and Lynn, took over as president in 1977. Since that time, Pressman Toy Company has marketed a series of family games, including the code-breaking game Mastermind, the tile-based game Rummikub and the dominoes variant Tri-Ominos. The company has also created licensed products for game shows such as Deal or No Deal, Jeopardy!, Wheel of Fortune and Who Wants to Be a Millionaire? and markets games based on such popular TV series and movies as Scooby-Doo, Hello Kitty, Dinosaur Train, Happy Feet Two, The Smurfs, Modern Family, and Diary of a Wimpy Kid.

In July 2014, the Pressman Toy Corporation was bought by Goliath Games, a Dutch game manufacturer.
