= MN&S Spur =

Railway line in the United States of America

The MN&S Spur is a 18.5-mile (29.8 km) railroad line operated by Canadian Pacific Kansas City and Progressive Rail Inc. The route runs through suburbs immediately west of Minneapolis, Minnesota, from MN&S Junction in Crystal south to Auto Club Junction in Bloomington near the Minnesota River. This path is parallel to Minnesota State Highway 100, which is about half a mile east of the rail line.

== History ==
Today's MN&S Spur was originally built starting in 1908 as part of the Minneapolis, St. Paul, Rochester and Dubuque Electric Traction Company, more commonly known as the Dan Patch Line. That railroad fell into bankruptcy in less than a decade, but the successor Minneapolis, Northfield and Southern Railway was more successful and operated independently until being acquired by the Soo Line Railroad in 1982. It carried passenger trains and interurbans until 1942. The Minneapolis, Northfield and Southern is the source of the "MN&S" name.

The old Dan Patch mainline extended south to Northfield, and CP/Soo still own the tracks from Savage to Lakeville. Today, Progressive Rail, Inc. owns the track between Lakeville and Northfield, operating it as their Jesse James Line. The Twin Cities and Western Railroad currently owns the Dan Patch Line Bridge over the Minnesota River. TC&W has trackage rights over the MN&S Spur and purchased the bridge in order to protect what they feel may become a valuable shipping route in the future. Early in 2016, TC&W rehabilitated the Dan Patch Bridge.

== Connections with other lines ==
The MN&S Spur has junctions with four rail lines among three railroad companies: The Canadian Pacific's Paynesville Subdivision in Crystal, the Union Pacific Railroad's Golden Valley Industrial Lead in Golden Valley, CP's Bass Lake Spur in St. Louis Park, and Progressive Rail's Dan Patch Line in Bloomington. The line also crosses over BNSF Railway's Wayzata Subdivision in St. Louis Park, and there used to be a junction between the two lines. There's also a connection with Union Pacific's Mankato Subdivision in Savage, but this is on the inactive segment of track.

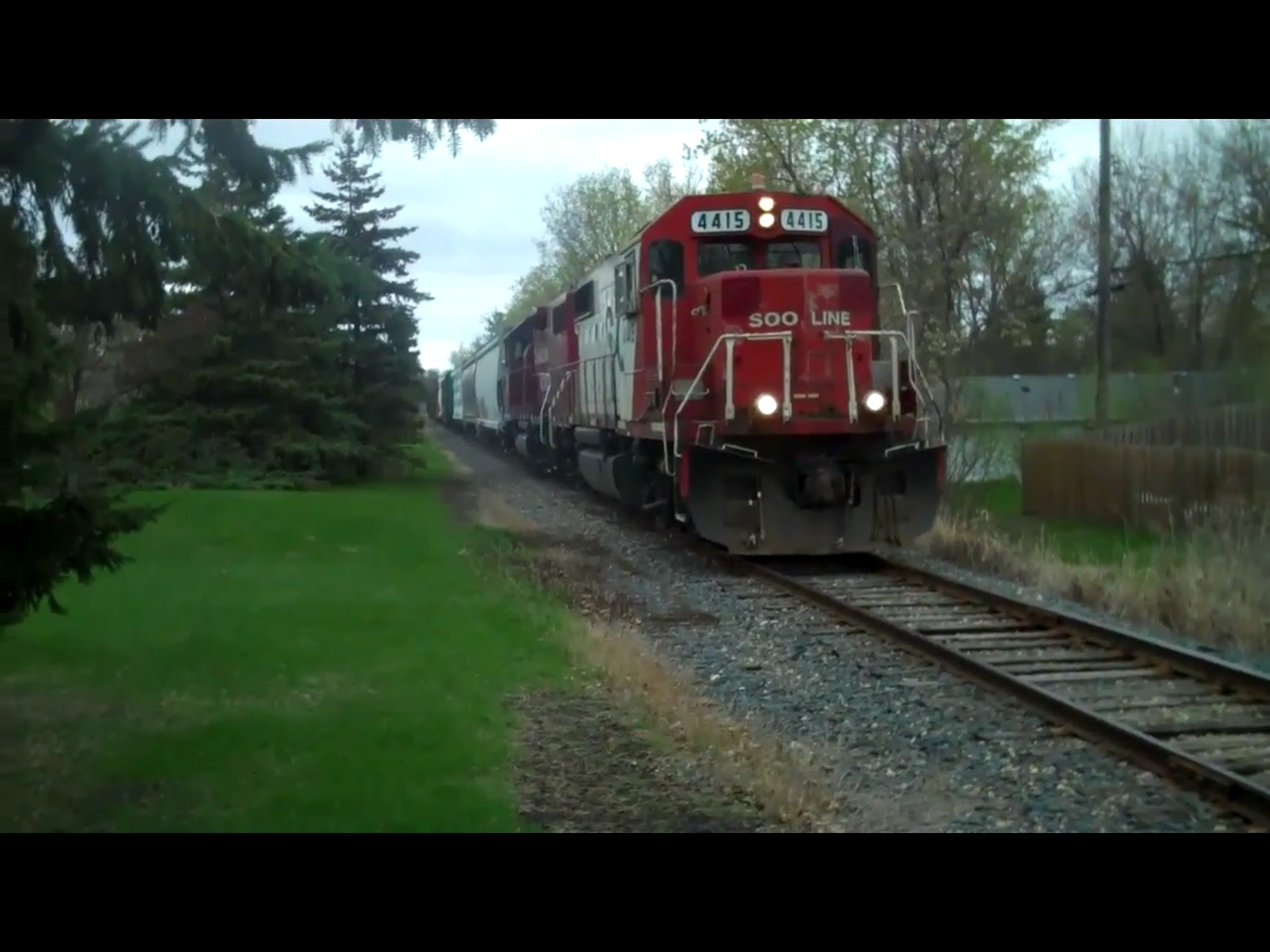
Train on the MN&S Spur in Edina

Twin Cities and Western is the primary operator on the Bass Lake Spur. While it was possible to interchange between the two lines, it was a cumbersome process because of the track layout. A replacement junction was planned since 1999 or earlier that would allow TC&W trains to make continuous moves onto the MN&S Spur, but those plans stalled for about ten years. TC&W used to operate through the 29th Street rail trench, now known as the Midtown Greenway, but the rail line was severed at Hiawatha Avenue in the 1990s. The Bass Lake Spur was temporarily routed along the Kenilworth Trail to connect with BNSF Railway's Wayzata Subdivision in Minneapolis. That connection was only expected to last between one and six years, but in 2018, after TC&W opposed the reroute onto the MN&S Spur because it was unsafe, the alignment became permanent.

In 2010, Hennepin County and the Metropolitan Council planned to build the Metro Green Line Extension light rail line along the Kenilworth Trail alignment being used by the Bass Lake Spur, so the MN&S interchange project was being reexamined. A new study was planned to be complete by the end of the year.

Progressive Rail's current Dan Patch Line was also a branch of the MN&S. It led to the southern end of Nicollet Avenue in Minneapolis where MN&S interurban passengers could board streetcars operated by the Twin City Rapid Transit Company and continue into downtown.

== See also ==
- Dan Patch Corridor
