= Bass Lake Spur =

Railroad line in Minnesota

The Bass Lake Spur is a railroad line owned by the Metropolitan Council that runs 6.8 miles (10.9 km) from Minneapolis, Minnesota west to the suburb of Minnetonka. The primary operator on the line is the Twin Cities and Western Railroad which has trackage rights on the entire line and uses it to run trains from their main line to BNSF Railway's Wayzata Subdivision.

The Bass Lake Spur had been part of the Chicago, Milwaukee, St. Paul and Pacific Railroad (the Milwaukee Road). A parallel line built by the Minneapolis and St. Louis Railway followed the Bass Lake line very closely from Minneapolis to Hopkins, where the two lines deviated. The M&StL line ran somewhat farther north than the Milwaukee Road, but dived southward farther west. The two lines crossed at Tower E-14 in Minnetonka, which is where the Bass Lake Spur ends today and becomes the Twin Cities and Western Railroad's Glencoe Subdivision.

In the east, the line formerly continued through Minneapolis in the 29th Street grade separation, now known as the Midtown Greenway. That line carried rails to the Short Line connecting Minneapolis to neighboring Saint Paul. However, the route was severed in the 1990s when Hiawatha Avenue was reconstructed. A temporary link was built between the Bass Lake line and the BNSF Railway along the Kenilworth Trail, a former Minneapolis and St. Louis Railway right-of-way. However, this link was only meant to last between one and six years. As of 2020, it has been in place for over two decades.

An improved junction with CP's MN&S Spur has been planned since 1999. While there is an existing connection, it doesn't allow for continuous moves from one line to the other. Interest in building the junction has been reignited as the Metro Green Line Extension light rail line has moved toward implementation. The Metro Green Line Extension will use the Bass Lake Spur's current right-of-way along the Kenilworth Trail, so a new way of moving trains off of the Twin Cities and Western's main line into the rest of the Twin Cities rail system is necessary.
