= Dan Patch Corridor =

Commuter rail line in Minnesota

Overview
- Termini: Minneapolis; Northfield

Service
- Type: Commuter rail line

Technical
- Line length: 40 miles (64 km)
- Character: Commuter rail
- Track gauge: 4 ft 8 1/2 in (1,435 mm) standard gauge
Route map

The Dan Patch Corridor is a proposed commuter rail line that would serve a region which runs from Minneapolis to Northfield, Minnesota. The corridor consists of the tracks on the former Minneapolis St. Paul Rochester and Dubuque Electric Traction Company lines, which came to be known as the Dan Patch lines. It was proposed as a passenger rail line in 2000 after being identified as a "Tier One" corridor in the Minnesota Department of Transportation's 2000 Commuter Rail System Plan before being given a study ban during the 2002 Minnesota legislative session. It sat in relative silence until 2008, when bills were introduced in the Minnesota State Legislature to potentially revive discussion. On May 21, 2023, the Minnesota House of Representatives and Minnesota Senate passed an omnibus transit bill that removed the study ban for the Dan Patch line.

== History ==
For more information on the MStPR&D and the MNS Ry., see the Minneapolis, Northfield and Southern Railway page.

The Dan Patch Corridor was the brainchild of entrepreneur Marion Willis Savage. Incorporated in 1907 as the Minneapolis St. Paul Rochester and Dubuque Electric Traction Company (MStPR&D), the line began service in 1908 as a passenger line running south from Minneapolis. Savage marketed the line as the "Dan Patch Line," a connection from Minneapolis to his farm in Savage, Minnesota, where he housed his famous harness racing horse, Dan Patch. After realizing that his horse was not enough to draw people to his rail line, he began work on Antlers Park, an amusement park on Lake Marion which opened in 1910. The line then experienced steady ridership growth between 1911 and 1915, and revenue obtained from the park was used to extend the line south to Northfield.

Despite the early successes, the MStPR&D began encountering trouble in 1914 when it found itself unable to completely finance several expansion projects, including a southern expansion to Faribault, Minnesota, which ultimately failed. Faced with growing debt, the line began taking on more freight traffic to make payments. The line found itself even further in debt by 1916, when Marion Willis Savage and Dan Patch died within several days of each other. Antlers Park was sold in 1917 to an employee of the MStPR&D, and the rail lines were taken over in 1918 by the Minneapolis, Northfield and Southern Railway (MN&S).

Under the control of the MN&S, the corridor expanded and stretched all the way to Mankato in the south and Randolph, Minnesota, in the east in 1921 by means of a lease agreement between the MN&S and the Chicago Great Western Railway. This encouraged passenger rail traffic between Mankato and Minneapolis, and provided the MN&S with a successful source of revenue that the MStPR&D lacked. In addition to the passenger traffic, the MN&S attracted new freight traffic to the line, and profited from the increased revenue accrued.

This increased emphasis on freight traffic proved to be a lifeline for the MN&S after increased bus and car usage grew in the late 1920s. The loss of passenger traffic resulted in the cut of the Northfield-Mankato and Northfield-Randolph passenger lines by 1931. A halt in all passenger traffic followed soon thereafter in 1942. The lines continued as freight lines after that point. The MN&S was acquired by the Soo Line Railroad in 1982, and they, in turn, were sold to the Canadian Pacific Railway in 1992.

== Commuter rail ==
=== 1998–2002: The line's resurgence ===
In 1997, at the request of the Minnesota state legislature, the Minnesota Department of Transportation (MnDOT) initiated a study investigating the feasibility of Commuter Rail in Minnesota. The study, released in 1998 and presented to the legislature in 1999, named the Dan Patch corridor as one of the three corridors in Minnesota with the highest potential for success. In 2000, the proposal was included in MnDOT's Commuter Rail System plan as a "Tier One" corridor, again seen as a project with a great likelihood of success. The plan placed the line at the third stage of the Minnesota commuter rail plan, to be developed after the Northstar Corridor from Minneapolis to Big Lake (operational as of 2009) and the Red Rock Corridor running from Minneapolis to Hastings were completed.

=== 2002: Study ban ===
The plan was still under consideration until 2002, when a bill banning further study on the route was pushed through the Minnesota legislature by two state senators, William Belanger (R-Bloomington) and Roy Terwilliger (R-Edina) who represented parts of the Twin Cities suburban area along the route.

The law (Chapter 393, Sec. 85. Dan Patch Commuter Rail Line; Prohibitions) requires removing all references, other than references for historical purposes, to the Dan Patch commuter rail line from any future revisions to the Metropolitan Council's Transportation Development Guide and Regional Transit Master Plan, the State Transportation Plan, and the Commissioner of Transportation's Commuter Rail System Plan. Additionally, the Metropolitan Council, Commissioner of Transportation, and regional rail authorities must not expend any money for study, planning, preliminary engineering, final design, or construction for the Dan Patch commuter rail line.

=== 2008: Reintroduction ===
The corridor sat in relative obscurity for six years until discussion began again in the media and among public officials. Congestion along the route and further discussion about transit in general in Minnesota prompted legislators to introduce a bill at the beginning of the 2008 session to lift the ban and allow discussion to continue. The bill was not acted on during the session.

=== 2010 Minnesota State Rail Plan ===
Under the 2010 Minnesota State Rail Plan, a commuter rail line from Minneapolis to Mankato is proposed. This commuter rail line would run on the Dan Patch Line to Savage before entering Union Pacific's Mankato Subdivision using a new interchange built between the two rail lines.

=== 2014: Name change ===
The Dan Patch Moratorium has been in law for over a decade, but there may be a way around the gag order; studying inter-city regional rail service instead of commuter rail service on the Dan Patch Corridor. A group of southern Minnesota communities including Northfield, Fairbault, and Owatonna may form a partnership to continue study of the Dan Patch Corridor in the form of inter-city regional rail service from as far south as Iowa to downtown Minneapolis. In addition Northfield has expressed interest in passenger rail service to downtown St. Paul.

=== 2016: Tier 1 Status ===
The Minnesota Department of Transportation upgraded the Dan Patch Corridor to Tier 1 Status under the 2015 State Rail Plan, meaning the project should be implemented by 2030. Minneapolis, Edina, Bloomington, and Burnsville are open to the proposal of passenger rail on the Dan Patch Corridor, but have no official stance. Savage and Northfield have an official stance supporting the Dan Patch Corridor project, while St. Louis Park and Lakeville have official stances against the project.

=== 2017: Edina Study ===
The Edina Transportation Commission and consultant Kimley-Horn conducted a study on the pros and cons of passenger rail on the Dan Patch Line. The most suitable station location was determined to be in the Grandview District due to business activity and jobs in the area as well as undeveloped land that could be used for a transit station and transit oriented development.

The majority of public feedback was negative, particularly from residents who live along the route. The study concluded with a recommendation not to pursue passenger rail on the Dan Patch Line at this time (as of 2018).

=== 2023: Gag Order Rescinded ===
The above referenced 2002: Study Ban "Gag Order" was rescinded in by the Minnesota Legislature in May 2023.

== Current commuter corridor ==
The Dan Patch Corridor from Northfield and Minneapolis broadly parallels the major commuter route of Interstates 35 and 35W, and proponents expect the service to siphon traffic from those highways. The line is proposed to use existing track and right-of-way owned by the Soo Line Railroad, being significantly cheaper than building a new rail corridor. Parts of the rail line are served by Progressive Rail and the Soo Line (doing business as Canadian Pacific Railway). Twin Cities and Western Railroad has trackage rights on the corridor, and owns the Dan Patch Line Bridge to access Port Cargill in Savage. Between Savage and Lakeville the tracks are out of service, having been last used in the early 1990s by the Soo Line.
