= Dan Patch Line Bridge =

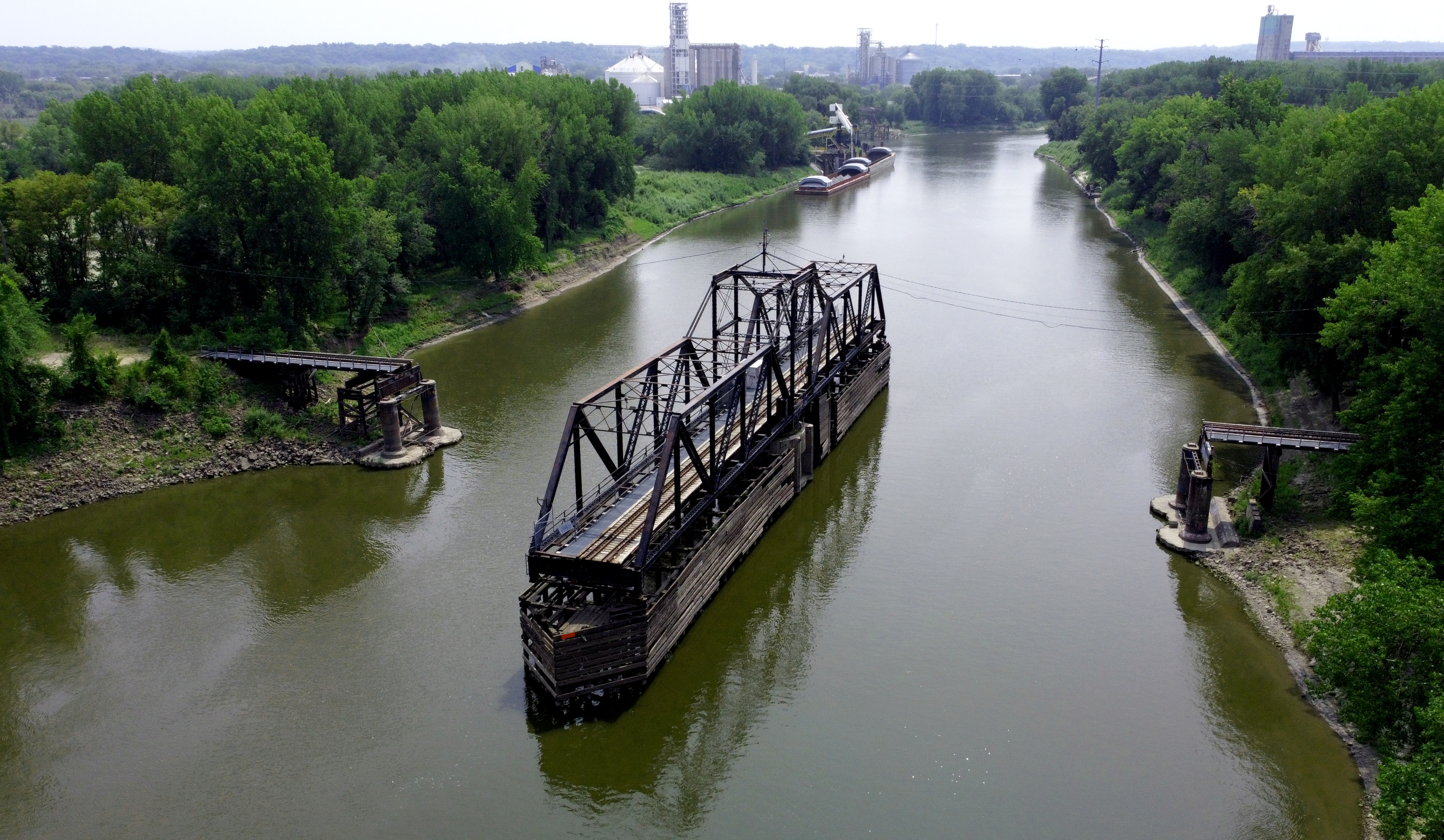
- Dan Patch Line bridge in the open position
- Coordinates: 44°47′25″N 93°21′10″W
- Carries: One rail crossing; formerly two traffic lanes
- Crosses: Minnesota River
- Locale: Bloomington, Minnesota and Savage, Minnesota
- ID number: N/A

Characteristics
- Design: Swing bridge
- Total length: 489 feet
- Clearance below: 20 feet

History
- Opened: 1908

Location
- Interactive map of Dan Patch Line Bridge

The Dan Patch Line Bridge is a railroad swing bridge that carries the Canadian Pacific Kansas City's MN&S Subdivision across the Minnesota River in the U.S. state of Minnesota. The MN&S Subdivision originated as the Minneapolis, St. Paul, Rochester and Dubuque Electric Traction Company, more commonly known as the Dan Patch Lines. Today's name for the rail line comes from the Minneapolis, Northfield and Southern Railroad, which took over the Dan Patch route after the original railroad fell into bankruptcy. Despite being met by Canadian Pacific Kansas City rails at either end, the bridge itself and short sections of track immediately north and south of the span are owned by the Twin Cities and Western Railroad, which has trackage rights on the CPKC line to the north. The TC&W purchased the bridge in order to protect a route that may become important in the future.

== Early history ==
The bridge was built by Marion W. Savage, owner of the racehorse Dan Patch, as part of a railroad extending from Minneapolis to Northfield. The span cost $50,000.00 to build. A single-lane deck to carry motor vehicles was added to the east side of the bridge, with semaphore traffic lights allowing alternate travel to the north and south. The railroad undertook major maintenance projects on the bridge in 1927 and 1952, and in 1965 planned to reconstruct the span. This project was not carried out, however, and routine bridge maintenance was performed in 1967. In the late 1970s, the highway portion of the bridge was closed because the Minneapolis, Northfield, and Southern wanted to raise the rental fees charged for use of the highway portion. The fees were requested to help pay for maintenance costs due to deterioration caused by road salting in the winter. The traffic deck was removed in the 1980s. The road side of the bridge carried CSAH-34 (Normandale Road on the north side, and Vernon Road on the south side). By the time the Soo Line acquired the MN&S in 1982, the bridge had been under water four times during Minnesota River floods and been often struck by barges. The bridge's approach spans were basically sound, but the main span was showing the effects of the barge strikes, as well as shifting of its piers, advanced localized corrosion, and general wear on the swing span's gears and turning machinery. By 1982, all trains would stop before proceeding over the bridge at slow speed. The bridge's new owner concluded that the span would require slow speed restrictions unless "substantial maintenance" was done on the bridge. In 1986, the Soo ceased using the bridge, but in 1996, the Twin Cities & Western purchased not only the bridge but also the old MN&S main line from Auto Club Junction in Bloomington to a point just south of Highway 13 in Savage. This was done to provide the TC&W with access to the grain terminals along the Minnesota River at Savage. The first train crossed the revived span on August 20, 1996. TC&W subsequently operated trains to Savage on an as-needed basis. The TC&W also converted the bridge from manual to remote control operation. Due to a downturn in the Minnesota River market, TC&W last used the bridge in 2007, but it retained ownership.

== Current status ==
Under the 2010 Minnesota State Rail Plan, the Dan Patch Line Bridge would be replaced with a new one-track bridge that would cost around $34 million.

In 2015, it was reported that TC&W planned to repair the bridge and resume direct rail access to the Post Savage terminals along the south banks of Minnesota River. The city of Savage subsequently announced a study to examine a new road crossing at the bridge. TC&W is supportive of a new road crossing, but the city of Bloomington is not. In 2016, it was announced that the bridge was being reopened for use due to an expected surge in grain traffic, with the bridge to see approximately one grain train per day. However, rail service to the Port of Savage via the Dan Patch Line Bridge has not begun as of 2026. Twin Cities & Western continues to transport grain to the rail yards in St. Paul for interchange with Union Pacific, and Union Pacific transports the rest of the way to Savage via the Mankato Subdivision. As of September, 2022, TC&W was seeking $440,000 in state funding to rehabilitate a three-quarter mile segment of track south of the bridge that would enable direct service to Savage to resume.

On July 15, 2022, four teenage boys were found climbing the bridge and detained. After a brief investigation, the Savage City Police Department determined there was no vandalism and the teenagers were not charged with anything.

== Bibliography ==
- Luecke, John; Spyhalski, Paul (2013). The Minneapolis, Northfield, & Southern Railway: From Dan Patch To Dragons. Saint Paul, Minnesota: Grenadier Publications.
- Olson, Russell (1976). The Electric Railways of Minnesota. Hopkins, MN: Minnesota Transportation Museum.
