= Minneapolis, Northfield and Southern Railway =

Shortline railroad in Minnesota

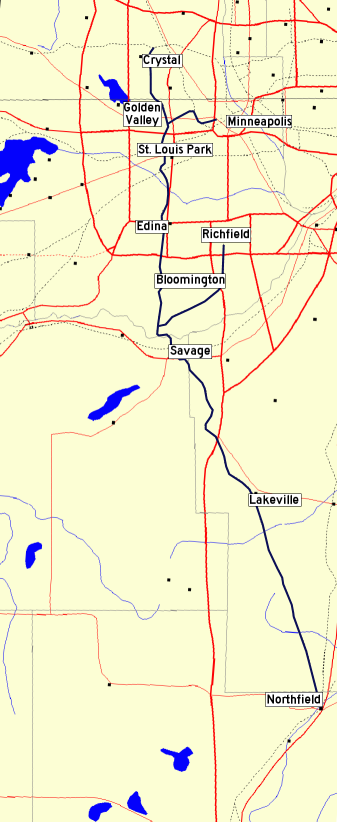

Overview
- Headquarters: Minneapolis
- Reporting mark: MNS
- Locale: Minnesota
- Dates of operation: 1918–1985
- Predecessor: Minneapolis St. Paul Rochester & Dubuque Electric Traction Company
- Successor: Soo Line Railroad

Technical
- Track gauge: 4 ft 8 1/2 in (1,435 mm) standard gauge

The Minneapolis, Northfield and Southern Railway (reporting mark MNS) was an 87-mile (140 km) long American shortline railroad connecting Minneapolis and Northfield, Minnesota. It was incorporated in 1918 to take over the trackage of the former Minneapolis, St. Paul, Rochester and Dubuque Electric Traction Company, also known as the Dan Patch Lines. On June 2, 1982, it was acquired by the Soo Line Railroad, which operated it as a separate railroad until merging it on January 1, 1986, along with the Chicago, Milwaukee, St. Paul and Pacific Railroad (Milwaukee Road).

Until around 1963, it was a Class I railroad; in 1967, it reported 131 million ton-miles of revenue freight on 77 miles (124 km) of railroad.

== The Dan Patch Lines ==
Marion W. Savage, owner of the race horse Dan Patch, planned an electric railroad that would connect the Twin Cities to his farm and stables south of the Minnesota River. Savage purchased Dan Patch for $62,000 (a fortune in 1902), then lavishly promoted his equine protégé.

Savage and his backers chose 54th and Nicollet, at the time the Richfield-Minneapolis border, as the starting point for the new railroad. Minneapolis' Nicollet streetcar line ended at that spot, so passengers could easily transfer to the adjacent Dan Patch system. Its owners named their new firm the Minneapolis, St. Paul, Rochester and Dubuque Electric Traction Company, but no one used the full name. Instead, they preferred the nickname "Dan Patch Line." Construction began in 1908, eventually reaching Northfield in late 1910. Grading began on an extension to Faribault in 1911, but the company never secured an entrance into Faribault and abandoned the project.

The new railroad built four stations in Richfield, with platforms along the Nicollet Avenue corridor – on the Bachman's farmstead spur at 62nd, Goodspeed's farmstead at 66th, Irwin's farmstead on 72nd and Wilson's farmstead on the southwest corner of 78th. They also completed a company-developed picnic destination named Antlers Park, now part of the Lakeville city park system. Richfield gardeners and farmers used the Dan Patch railroad for shipping produce, dairy products and other goods. Passengers shared the platforms with farmers.

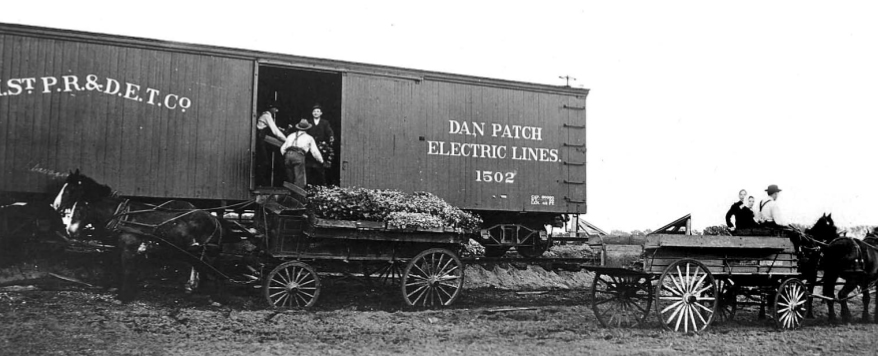
Bachman farmstead workers load produce onto a Dan Patch line boxcar for delivery to market.

Original plans called for the Dan Patch Line to be electrified, but did not happen. The company used steam engines for their freight trains, while gas-electric locomotives and motorcars handled passenger traffic. Savage's penchant for first-class style did produce luxurious coaches – red, plush seat cushions and fringed shades on windows added a touch of Victorian elegance.

Management struggled to make the rail route profitable without consistent success. According to some reports, the railroad had an abysmal operating ratio of 147%. It persisted in operation until less than a week after the deaths of the horse Dan Patch and his owner Colonel Savage, it slumped into receivership on July 16, 1916.

== Bankruptcy, receivership, and new ownership ==
Four days after the bankruptcy, Charles P. Bratnober (president of the Minneapolis, Anoka and Cuyuna Range Railroad) was appointed receiver. The Minneapolis, Northfield and Southern Railroad, incorporated during June 1918 in South Dakota, bought the remnants of Savage's former company at foreclosure on August 6, 1918. The new owners promoted the Dan Patch's route from Northfield to Minneapolis, and successfully marketed the reconstituted railroad as a bridge line around the congested Twin Cities freight yards.

As finally constructed, the MN&S mainline ran in what is now the west metro of the Twin Cities. From its junction with the Minneapolis, St. Paul and Sault Ste. Marie Railroad at MNS Junction in Crystal, it traveled through New Hope, Golden Valley, St. Louis Park, Edina, Bloomington, Savage, Lakeville and down to Northfield. Along the way, the line connected the Soo Line with the Milwaukee Road, the Omaha Road, the Chicago Great Western and the Rock Island's St. Paul to Kansas City "Spine Line". They had shops at Glenwood on a spur line that went from the present area of Hwy 100 and Hwy 55 to the edge of downtown Minneapolis. Along that spur were connections to the Minneapolis and St. Louis Railway and Great Northern Railway. In addition, the original passenger "High Line" ran from Auto Club Junction in Bloomington through Richfield and into south Minneapolis, ending just north of the current Crosstown freeway.

Besides its freight service, the company continued passenger service using their gas-electric motorcars from Minneapolis to Antlers Park and Northfield until the 1940s. Until the Great Depression, the MN&S Ry. also used trackage rights on the Chicago Great Western from Northfield to Randolph and Mankato, and even after discontinuing passenger service maintained trackage rights to Randolph for freight service. Dan Patch's gas-electric locomotives were sold during bankruptcy, and freight was hauled by steam until the 1940s. Immediately after World War II, the MN&S began transitioning to diesel-electric locomotives such as the Baldwin DT-6-6-2000, then to various EMD models.

== Sale to the Soo Line and current usage ==
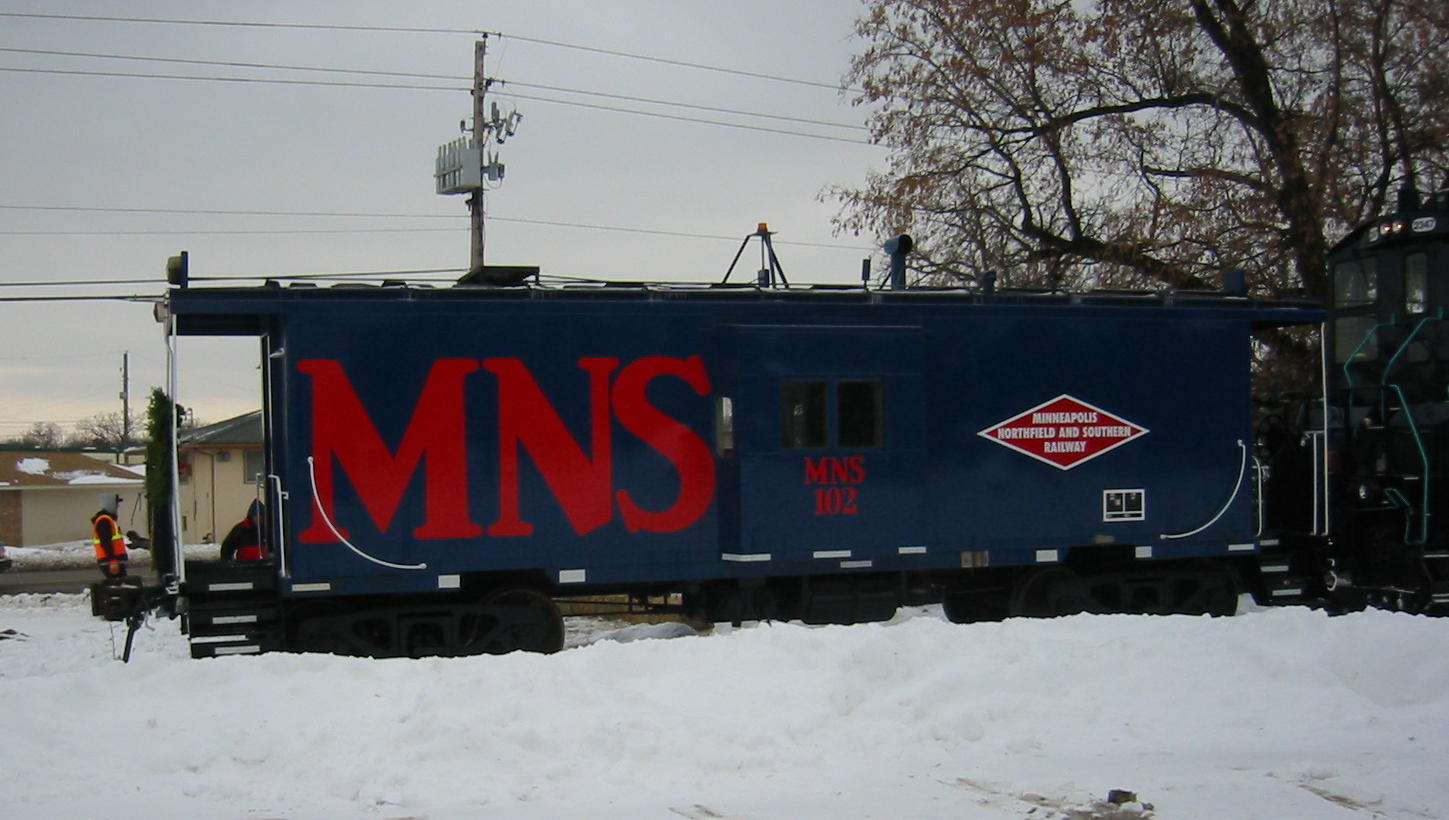
A caboose painted in the former Minneapolis, Northfield and Southern livery. This caboose is now in regular service on the Progressive Rail line in Bloomington, Minnesota.

The railroad was purchased in 1982 by the Soo Line, and merged into the Soo Line in 1986. For decades prior to the sale to the Soo Line, the MN&S had a lucrative business interchanging with several Class I railroads. Rock Island and Milwaukee Road at Northfield, C&NW at Savage, Soo Line at Crystal, M&StL at St Louis Park, Great Northern at Cedar Lake Yard in Minneapolis, and CGW over trackage rights between Randolph and Northfield. By the time of the sale to Soo Line in 1982, MN&S's interchange business was in shambles with the Rock Island and Milwaukee Road fading in bankruptcy and the sale of CGW and M&StL to C&NW in the 1960s leaving only the Soo Line and Burlington Northern as viable interchange partners. The loss of interchange traffic at Randolph when CGW merged with C&NW in 1968 was a significant setback as C&NW already had its own routes to the Twin Cities and kept most of the ex-CGW inbound freight on its own rails. By 1982, the Soo Line was ready to make several moves and had sufficient funds to counter competing offers. Soo Line's grand plan was to secure MN&S to Northfield, then purchase the Spine Line to Kansas City from Rock Island in its liquidation. However, C&NW purchased the Spine Line for $93 million in 1983. The Soo Line saved face in 1985 by purchasing the bankrupt Milwaukee Road. The Soo Line's loss of the Spine Line and the transfer of southbound freight to the former Milwaukee Road route to Northfield reduced service on the entire MN&S for the next 25 years. By 1997, six years after the Soo Line was purchased by Canadian Pacific, the last train had gone between Lakeville and Savage, and the tracks have remained out-of-service since then. In 1999 the I&M Rail Link gained trackage rights on the former MN&S to Minneapolis but never utilized them. In 2004, during which Burnsville proposed reopening an at-grade crossing on the MN&S, Canadian Pacific stated that by the next five years Progressive Rail would be utilizing the MN&S route that is currently out-of-service, but this didn't happen. The Glenwood shops were closed and demolished, and the tracks removed in the mid-1980s. Despite that, of the MN&S mainline extending south to Northfield, the Soo's owner, Canadian Pacific Kansas City (CPKC), still owns the tracks from Savage to Lakeville and from the Minnesota River north to MNS Junction.

The Twin Cities and Western Railroad owns the Dan Patch Line Bridge over the Minnesota River. TC&W has trackage rights over the MN&S Spur and purchased the bridge to protect what they feel may become a valuable shipping route in the future.

In 2016, TC&W undertook a major rehabilitation of the Dan Patch Line Bridge in anticipation of an upsurge in grain traffic. By September of 2022, TC&W was seeking Minnesota state funding to rehabilitate a three-quarter mile stretch of the old MN&S main in Savage, a section of track that would enable direct service to resume. Progressive Rail, Inc. owns the track between Lakeville and Northfield, operating it as their Jesse James Line. Progressive Rail owns and occasionally operates two MN&S cabooses as well as a former MN&S EMD SD39. Some of Progressive Rail's rolling stock is painted in an MN&S-inspired livery.

The Minnesota Department of Transportation has performed studies on operating commuter rail over the Dan Patch Line. This service would be known as the Dan Patch Corridor. Although the Minnesota Legislature imposed a ban on state money going to further studies of the proposed service in 2002, in 2023, this ban was lifted.

In late summer 2024, the Canadian Pacific Kansas City (CPKC) Railway began running late-night trains on the route, disturbing nearby residents. Despite the complaints, the CPKC is not considering reducing the night trains. The city of St. Louis Park is looking into establishing whistle quiet zones along the route, but notes that any such process would take years and significant investments from the city.

Two historic bridges on the inactive portion of the MN&S have been removed as of 2026. In late August of 2023, the Lynn Avenue bridge in Savage, a concrete structure dating from 1926, was damaged by a truck, and its decking was subsequently removed. In late September of 2026, the 106-year-old trestle over Quentin Avenue in Savage was removed after CPKC gave the city permission.

== Bibliography ==
- Luecke, John; Spyhalski, Paul (2013). The Minneapolis Northfield & Southern Railway: From Dan Patch To Dragons. Saint Paul, MN: Grenadier Publications. ISBN 978-0-9621020-9-7.
- Olson, Russell (1976). The Electric Railways of Minnesota. Hopkins, MN: Minnesota Transportation Museum.
