= Joe Young (horse) =

Famous harness racing horse

Joe Young (1876-1898) was an award-winning Standardbred trotter from Peabody, Kansas at a time when harness racing was one of the most popular sports in the US. He was known for his speed and famous offspring, which include Joe Patchen and Dan Patch, a 1958 Harness Racing Hall of Fame inductee and the most famous horse in the world at the turn of the 20th century.

== Breeding ==
Joe Young was foaled in Iowa in 1876. He was sold to William Ward as a colt. Joe Young first lived in Texas, after which he moved to Peabody Kansas. In Peabody, a man named C.E. Westbrook traded cattle and for him that totaled $2,000. Westbrook would be the owner for 5-6 years.

The horse was "coal-black with white feet and a stripe in face." The Peabody Weekly Republican called him an "inimitable model of beauty....[he] is undoubtedly the finest-shaped, best-built, cleanest-limbed, best-muscled fast trotter we have ever seen." who hitched the young Joe Young on a prairie wagon and drove him home to Kansas where he would set a mile record of 2:18 at 20 years old. C.E. Westbrook owned the horse until 1887, when he was sold to Willis Westbrook and G.W. Schupe for $10,000 (about $314,000 in 2022). For comparison, the average cost of a horse in 1887 in Kansas was likely around $45 (about $1,400 in 2022). Joe Young was known to have a "kindly disposition" that made people around him adore him. He was also a little lazy. If no horse was in front of him, he would slow down in a race. To counteract this, his owner C.E. Westbrook would use a pacing horse to run alongside him.

== Racing career ==
Joe Young's racing career culminated when he was twenty years old in 1895. Still driven by his original owner C.E. Westbrook, he broke his own record of 2:19:30 by over a minute with his new astonishing record of 2:18. The race itself, held on August 7 in Topeka, was a highlight of the races that day. Being an older horse with the "weight of 20 years [as] the handicap," he may have been seen as an underdog as he entered into his older years. He fell behind about halfway through the race, only to come surging back and win it all in a very exciting finish.

== Legacy and Offspring ==
Horses sired by Joe Young came to be known as "Joe Young horses," and can be seen advertised this way as late as 1905. The term "Joe Young horse" appears synonymous with a high quality horse in several Kansas newspaper articles starting in the mid-to-late 1880's. "There are scores of visitors to the stables at the fair grounds each day to look at the famous Joe Young horses," wrote The Leader Courier in Kingman, Kansas. "There are few better stables of horses in south-west Kansas..."

Joe Young horses fetched handsome prices: one Joe Young colt sold for $1,100 in 1888 (about $34,500 in 2022). Among Joe Young's famous offspring was Joe Patchen, called the "iron race horse of the age" due to his disproportionately long legs. Joe Patchen then sired Dan Patch, who attracted a crowd of 15,000 spectators when he was to compete at the Kansas State Fair in 1904.

== Death ==
Joe Young's owner during the horse's prime, C.E. Westbrook, wrote in a Kansas Board of Agriculture report that the horse died at the age of 22 after getting into an accident. Westbrook wrote that, "he was as active and stylish as a four-year-old" at the time of his death.

== Pedigree ==
Joe Young was sired by Star of the West, who was sired by Flying Cloud. Star of the West's lineage can be traced back to Messenger, who was the great-grandsire of the famous Hambletonian 10. Joe Young's dam was Lady Gregory, sired by Green's Bashaw. His direct offspring included Joe Younger (2:13:15) and most notably Josephine Young, the result of a breeding with a common mare. Josephine Young was bred to Patchen Wilkes, resulting in the famous Joe Patchen (2:01:15), who then sired Dan Patch (1:55:15). Joe Young's winning genes went down at least nine generations. In 1978, about 100 years after Joe Young raced and breathed, one of his ninth generation offspring named Fire Cloud won the "Joe Young Memorial Driving Meet," named in the old-time horse's honor.

Pedigree of Joe Young
| Sire Star of the West | Jackson's Flying Cloud | Black Hawk | Andrew Jackson |
| Sire Star of the West | Jackson's Flying Cloud | Black Hawk | Dam of Trotting Mare Sally Miller |
| Sire Star of the West | Jackson's Flying Cloud | Andrew Jackson Mare | Andrew Jackson |
| Sire Star of the West | Jackson's Flying Cloud | Andrew Jackson Mare | n/a |
| Sire Star of the West | Grey Fanny | Eureka | Black Hawk |
| Sire Star of the West | Grey Fanny | Eureka | n/a |
| Sire Star of the West | Grey Fanny | Dam by Dover Messenger | Dover Messenger |
| Sire Star of the West | Grey Fanny | Dam by Dover Messenger | n/a |
| Dam Lady Gregory | Green's Bashaw | Vernols Black Hawk | Long Island Black Hawk |
| Dam Lady Gregory | Green's Bashaw | Vernols Black Hawk | Mare by Kentucky Whip |
| Dam Lady Gregory | Green's Bashaw | Belle | Webbers Tom Thumb |
| Dam Lady Gregory | Green's Bashaw | Belle | Charles Kent Mare |
| Dam Lady Gregory | Heany Mare | Simpson's Blackbird | Camden |
| Dam Lady Gregory | Heany Mare | Simpson's Blackbird | Post Boy Mare |
| Dam Lady Gregory | Heany Mare | n/a | n/a |
| Dam Lady Gregory | Heany Mare | n/a | n/a |
