= Glencoe Subdivision =

Coordinates: 44.7716°N 94.1507°W

The Twin Cities and Western Railroad's Glencoe Subdivision is a segment of railway track from Hopkins, Minnesota to Montevideo, Minnesota built by the Hastings and Dakota Railroad in 1878 and first charted that year. The company extended them to Ortonville, Minnesota by 1879.

The Hastings and Dakota Railroad had a large junction at Cologne, Minnesota to access this line. It was taken over by the Chicago, Milwaukee, St. Paul and Pacific Railroad in the 1880s. Milwaukee Later built the Lake Street depression to connect to St. Paul, which was known as "the shortline". Milwaukee Railroad relocated large portions of the line between Hopkins and Cologne in 1913. The Milwaukee Road operated until it was purchased by Soo Line Railroad in 1985. Soo Line sold the line off to the Twin Cities and Western Railroad in 1991.
