= Joe Patchen =

American Standardbred racehorse

Joe Patchen (May 5, 1889 – February 18, 1917) was a Standardbred racehorse foaled in Peabody, Kansas, United States. His sire was Patchen Wilkes and his dam was Josephine Young. Though best remembered for siring the famous Dan Patch, Joe Patchen enjoyed a successful racing career of his own: he was nicknamed "the iron race-horse of the age."

== Breeding ==
Joe Patchen was foaled May 5, 1889 in Peabody, Kansas. He was bred by C and M.M. Rathbone of the same town.

Joe Patchen was "black, four white feet, white in the face, height 16.25 [hands], 1250 pounds."

== Racing career ==
A large-bodied horse with unusually long legs, Joe Patchen was a strong contender on half-mile tracks. Joe Patchen won 53% of the races in which he started, and finished second in 39%. He was unplaced (out of the top four) in only 3% of his races. Though his exact career winnings are unknown, estimates place them in excess of $50,000. In August 1896, Joe Patchen broke the world records for both a half-mile and mile track by completing two laps on the half-mile Combination Park in 2:05¼ on August 8 and one lap of the mile-long Rigby Park in 2:03 on August 21. The half-mile record stood for seven years until his son Dan Patch lowered it to 2:04.

The Kansas State Board of Agriculture said that "[Joe] Patchen's untiring courage as a race horse seems to be without a peer."

Patchen was trained by Harness Racing Hall of Fame trainer John Dickerson, and was himself inducted into the Hall of Fame in 1954.

== Pedigree ==
Joe Patchen was a part of the "Joe Young" lineage that was desired for Kansas racehorses at the time. His sire Patchen Wilkes also had desirable racing genes and traced to Wilkes Boy, Guy Wilkes, and Baron Wilkes.
