= Worthington Subdivision =

Railway line in the United States of America

The Worthington Subdivision or Worthington Sub is a railway line operated by Union Pacific Railroad. It runs generally southwest-northeast and begins at a siding in St. James Township, Minnesota, where the Mankato Subdivision ends, and it continues to Sioux City, Iowa. The line has yard facilities in Worthington and Sioux City, as well as a small yard north of Worthington in Hersey and Lorain townships called Elk Creek. The line passes through many small towns and villages with grain elevators along its route, and it is the origin of numerous grain unit trains. As of 2003 the line sees 4 freight trains daily.

The line began as the St. Paul and Sioux City railroad and was constructed between 1871 and 1872. It then became a division of the Chicago, St. Paul, Minneapolis and Omaha Railway (Omaha Road), which in turn became part of the Chicago and North Western Railway in 1882. The Chicago and North Western Railway was acquired by Union Pacific in 1995.

Authority to occupy the main track is dispatched via CTC from West St. James to South Butterfield. From there, track warrant control (TWC) is used until Le Mars, Iowa, where automatic block signaling is used in conjunction with TWC. Union Pacific has trackage rights over CN's track from Le Mars to Sioux City, although UP dispatchers grant the authority to occupy the main track.

== Accidents ==
On November 18, 1999, an empty northbound Union Pacific grain unit train was stopped on the main track at Carnes to meet a southbound UP manifest train which was to take the siding. For reasons unknown, the southbound train did not enter the siding and struck the stopped northbound train head-on, derailing 30 cars, five locomotives, and claiming the life of 23-year-old conductor Paul Schmidt of Boone, Iowa on the southbound train. Dale Evans, the driver of a crew transport van parked nearby was also killed. This accident was a prompt for legislation for the implementation of Positive Train Control, which could have prevented the accident.

On May 16, 2021, a Union Pacific manifest train bound for North Platte, Nebraska derailed and caught fire in Sibley, Iowa. The derailment involved 47 cars which were carrying asphalt, hydrochloric acid, and potassium hydroxide. Approximately 80 people were evacuated from a 2.5 mi radius around the derailment site, and the derailed cars were allowed to burn for nearly two days. No injuries or deaths occurred.
