= Kansas State Fair =

Annual fair in Hutchinson, Kansas, US

Coordinates: 38°04′40″N 97°55′38″W

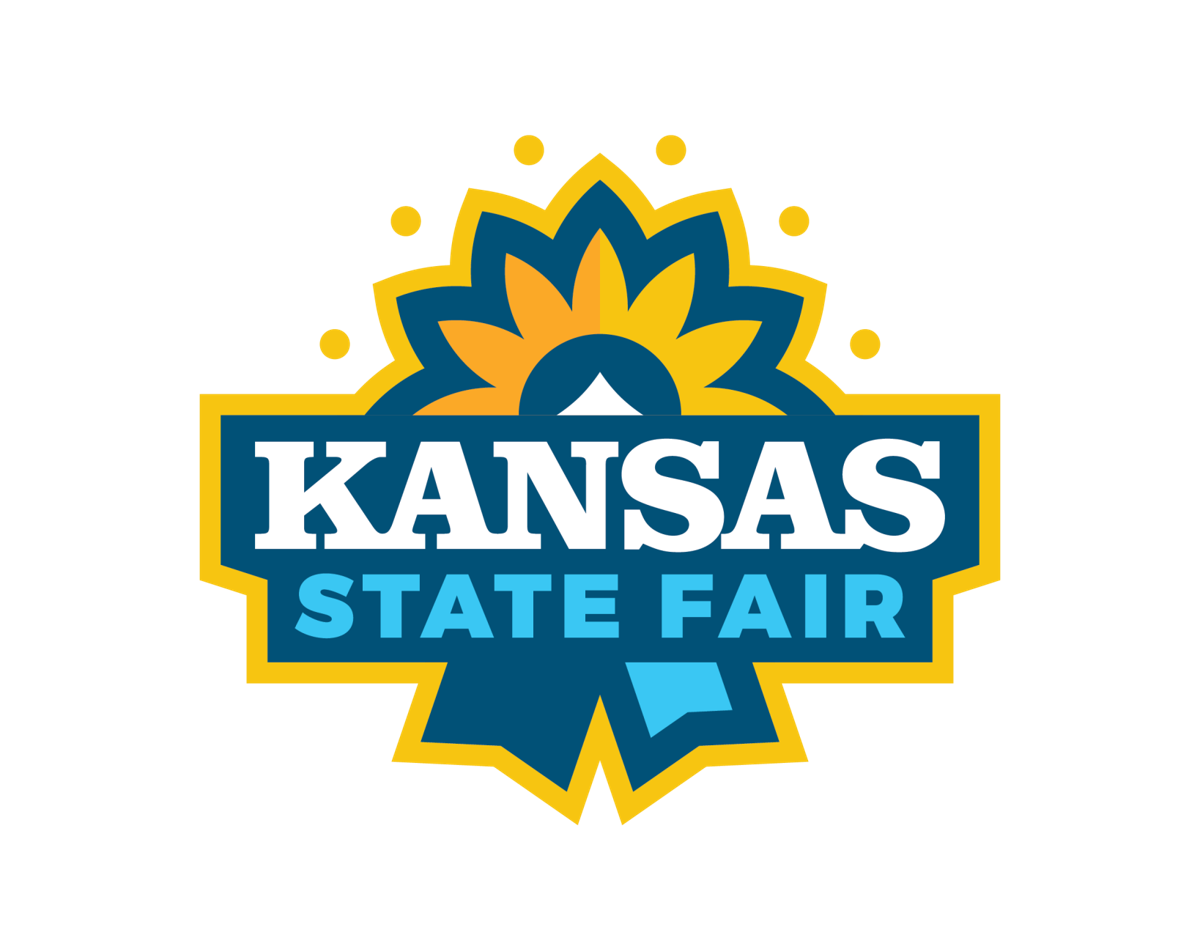
- 2019 logo

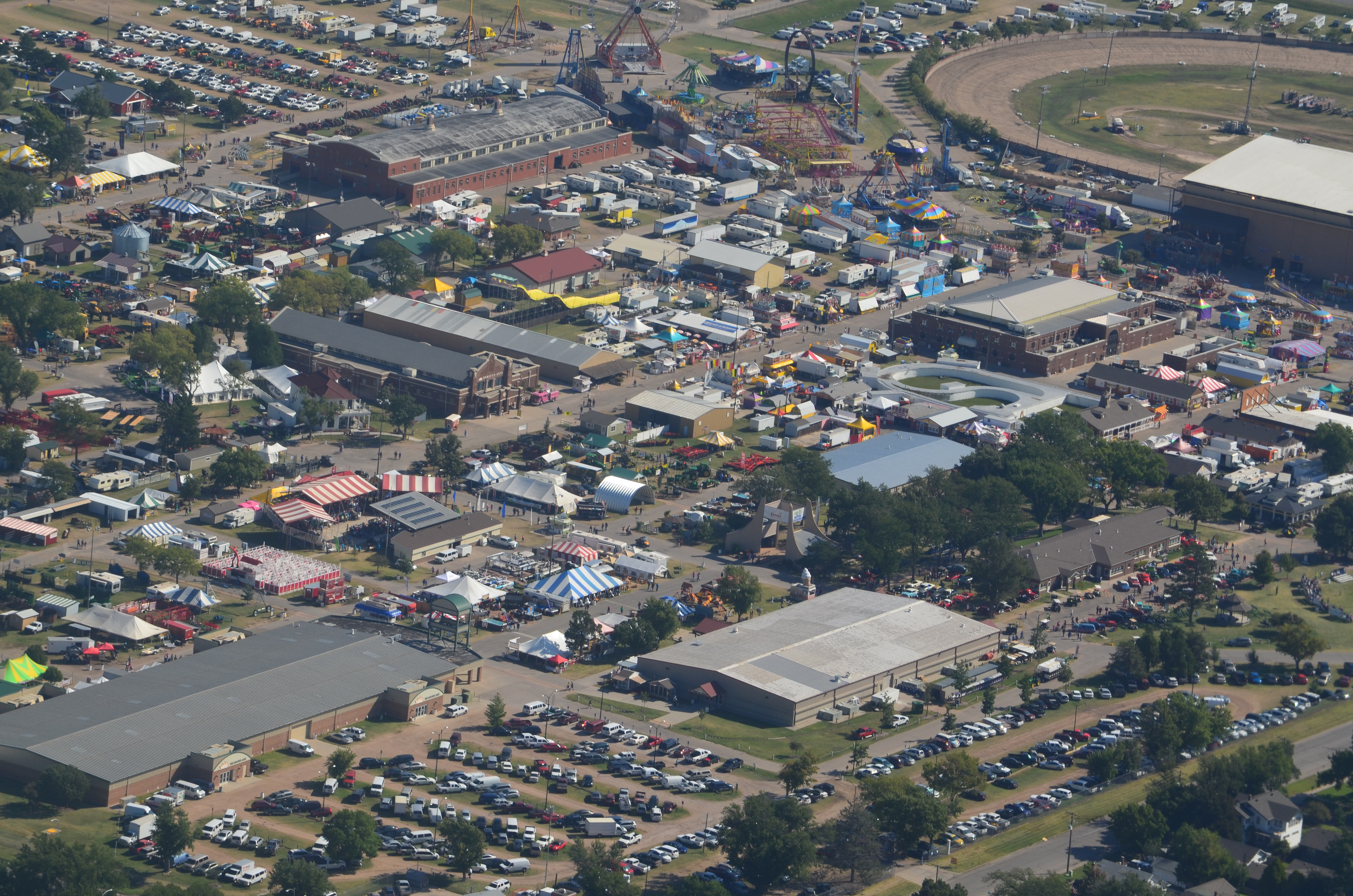
- 2014 aerial view
- Genre: State fair
- Dates: 10 days (starts Friday following Labor Day in September)
- Locations: 2000 N. Poplar St., Hutchinson, Kansas, USA
- Years active: 1913–2019, 2021–
- Attendance: 330,044 (2023)
- Website: kansasstatefair.com

Kansas State Fair is a state fair held annually in Hutchinson, Kansas, United States. It starts the Friday following Labor Day in September, and lasts for 10 days. This fair is the largest single event in the state and attracts approximately 350,000 people annually. The fairgrounds is centered at 23rd Ave between Main and Plum Street in Hutchinson, and consists of over 70 buildings on 280 acres (110 ha). It has full-time year-round staff. The 2026 fair was held from September 11 to 20.

== History ==
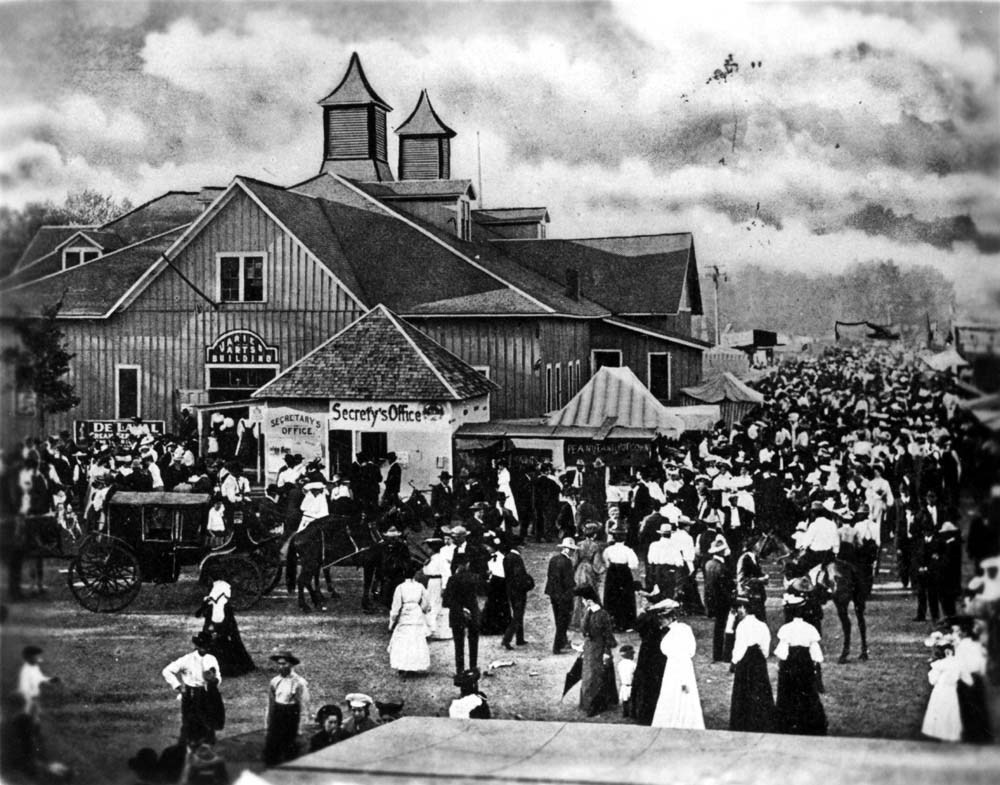
State Fair some year between 1900 and 1919

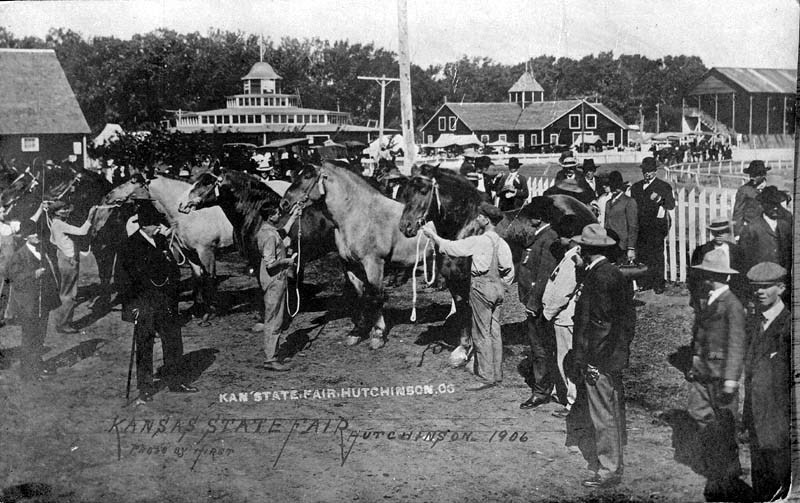
State Fair, 1906

=== Early state fairs ===
During the 19th century, the Kansas State Fair was held in various cities, such as Topeka and Wichita.

=== Early Reno County fairs ===
The first fair association was made on January 18, 1873, when the Reno County Agricultural Society was created. On September 23–24, 1873, the society hosted a fair which was held in a small wooden livery stable behind the bank on the northwest corner of Sherman and Main in Hutchinson.

Encouraged by the success of this first event, plans began for a bigger fair in 1874, with the society proposing a tax levy to support the event, but voters rejected the idea. Though turned down, the Agricultural Society pushed ahead and found acreage southeast of where the state reformatory would later be located, paid cash for the grounds, and on September 28–30 of 1875, presented the First Annual Reno County Fair. It featured 20 classes for entries, with most awards in the form of certificates, and a few $5 cash prizes. Agricultural exhibitions were also held during the years 1876 and 1877.

The Reno County Agricultural and Joint Stock Association was incorporated on September 2, 1878. In 1878, new grounds were purchased just north of Eastside Cemetery, and fairs were held there through the early 1880s.

Reorganized and renamed the Arkansas Valley Fair Association, the fair was moved back to its previous grounds for the 1885 event. These grounds southeast of the present Hutchinson Correctional Facility grew in the late 1880s and 1890s. New buildings were added nearly every year. A fence surrounded the property and the half-mile racetrack.

=== Official State Fair ===
The present state fair had its beginning on February 7, 1901, when a few men met to talk about organizing a fair association. The board of directors met on April 24, 1901, to elect officers. The name Central Kansas Fair Association was created. The fair was held in 1901 on 50 acres of land, which stretched along the east side of Main Street to Poplar, from 11th Avenue north to 17th Avenue in Hutchinson. The land was leased in trade for 10 percent of the gate receipts and half the concession privileges in 1901.

In 1903, the Central Kansas Fair was recognized by an act of the state legislature to give the fair association the license to legitimately call their event "The Kansas State Fair".

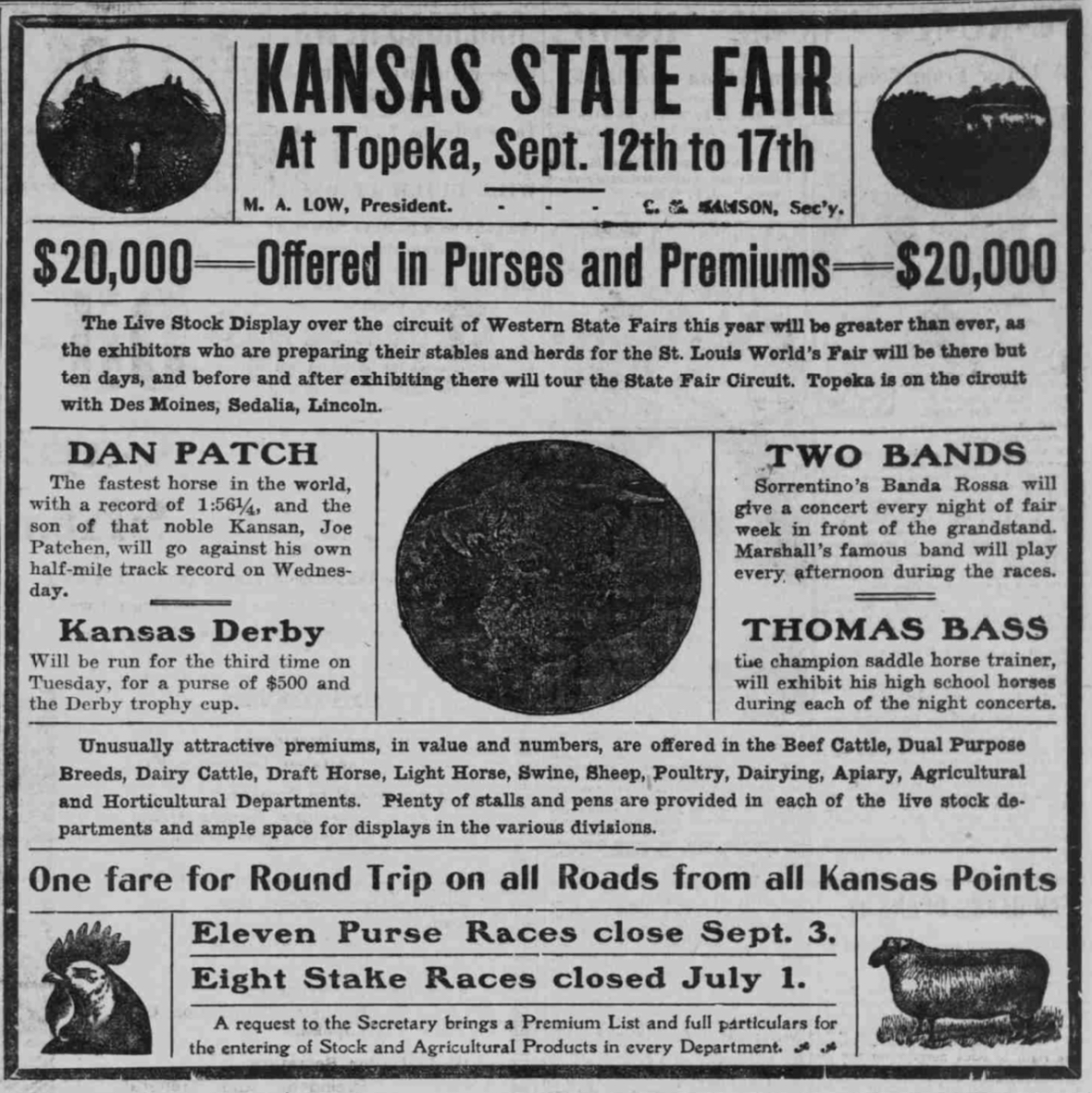
1904 Kansas State Fair advertisement in Topeka, listing Dan Patch harness racing horse

In 1912, 112 acres (45 ha) of land north of 17th Avenue and east of Main Street were purchased for expansion. It was decided for bonds to pay for this new land was put to a vote by Reno County voters in April 1913, and won by a margin of 4 to 1. A bill was passed in the Kansas legislature to grant Hutchinson fair monetary support in exchange for the city giving the state the fairgrounds. The first "official" Kansas State Fair was held September 13–20, 1913.

The Old Mill was completed for the opening of the 1915 fair. One thousand feet of water-filled channels featured boats which promised to transport passengers through "gloomy caves of gleesome gladness". In 1916, the House of Capper, a covered veranda, was built. It has been used as a shaded place to rest, the Professional Arts Building, and even a bandstand at one time.

The Cottonwood Court was built in 1928 and renovated in 2003. The building was originally used as an automobile building, which later became the Commercial Building, then finally the Cottonwood Court. The Grandstand was built in 1930. The Domestic Arts Building was built in 1930 and renovated in 2003. In 1931, a sandpit was landscaped and renamed as Lake Talbott. The Encampment Building was built in 1934. It was home to POWs and State Fair Soldiers during WWII.

The COVID-19 pandemic led to the cancellation of the 2020 fair, ending a 107-year streak of hosting annual fairs in the state. Despite the Great War & World War II, the fair went on.

== Grandstand entertainment ==
The state fair grandstand hosts events every evening, with concerts, a demolition derby, auto races, and truck / tractor pulls.

== Exhibits ==
The state fair has over 1,000 commercial vendor locations. They are utilized for competition, with over 30,000 entries in various competitive exhibit departments, education, through its Kansas' Largest Classroom field trip program, and for entertainment with strolling and stage entertainment in addition to the national acts performing at the grandstand.

In 2021, an insect collection submitted by a 4-H member attracted national attention because it included an invasive, non-native spotted lanternfly, which had not previously been identified in the state. The boy had correctly labeled the insect in his collection, and the fair's judges, who recognized its significance, informed state and federal agricultural officials about its existence.

== Yearly use ==
In addition to the annual state fair, the fairgrounds facilities are utilized throughout the year for a wide array of events, including horse and livestock shows, RV rallies, trade shows, flea markets, wedding receptions, family reunions, and company picnics.

== See also ==
- State fair and Agricultural show
- Cosmosphere, space museum in Hutchinson
- Strataca, salt mine museum in Hutchinson
