= Metropolitan Council =

For articles on Metropolitan council see:

== Italy ==
- Metropolitan Council in Bari
- Metropolitan Council in Bologna
- Metropolitan Council in Cagliari
- Metropolitan Council in Catania
- Metropolitan Council in Florence
- Metropolitan Council in Genoa
- Metropolitan Council in Messina
- Metropolitan Council in Milan
- Metropolitan Council in Naples
- Metropolitan Council in Palermo
- Metropolitan Council in Reggio Calabria
- Metropolitan Council in Rome
- Metropolitan Council in Turin
- Metropolitan Council in Venice

== United States ==
- Metropolitan Council (Minnesota)
  - Metropolitan Council Transit Operations
- Metropolitan Council (Nashville), Tennessee
- Metropolitan Council for Educational Opportunity a voluntary school desegregation program
- Metropolitan Council on Housing, New York
- Metropolitan Council on Jewish Poverty, New York
- Metropolitan Council, in Baton Rouge and East Baton Rouge Parish, Louisiana

== Elsewhere ==
- Metropolitan areas in Portugal
- Metropolitan county council, England
- Metropolitan district council (or metropolitan borough council), England
- Metropolitan Council of Lyon, France
- Metropolitan Toronto, Canada

== See also ==
- Metropolitan Board of Works, a former local government body for London, England
- Urban District Council
