= Mankato Subdivision =

Rail line in Minnesota

The Mankato Subdivision or Mankato Sub is a railway line operated by the Union Pacific Railroad. It runs generally southwest, starting at Chestnut Street in Saint Paul, Minnesota, where it crosses the Mississippi River, then runs south along the Mississippi and then the Minnesota River to Mankato, where it turns away from the river and continues west to St. James. From there Union Pacific's rails continue southwest toward Sioux City, Iowa, as the railroad's Worthington Subdivision.

== Connections ==
The rail line interchanges with the Canadian Pacific Railway's Merriam Park Subdivision at Chestnut Street in the north, and with CP subsidiary Dakota, Minnesota and Eastern Railroad in Mankato (Tracy Subdivision). The Union Pacific Montgomery Subdivision and the defunct Chaska Industrial Lead begin at a point named Merriam between Jordan and Carver.

== Operation ==
The line is primarily dispatched via track warrant control, but also has automatic block signaling from the junction at Merriam to Mankato. North of Chestnut Street and farther into the Merriam Park Subdivision, trains use centralized traffic control. The general speed limit for freight trains on the line is 49 miles per hour (79 km/h), though many segments are restricted to lower speeds. The street running in Shakopee, Minnesota on 2nd Avenue East and West has a speed limit is 10mph. There is no passenger service on the line, though any passenger excursions or business trains may operate up to 10 mph faster. As of 2003 the line between Saint Paul and Valley Park sees 6 freight trains daily, with 3 operating between Valley Park and Saint James.

== History ==
The Minnesota Valley Railway Company built from Mendota to Shakopee by 1865. The railroad was extended to Belle Plaine by 1866 and Le Sueur by 1867. It reached St. Peter by 1868 and Mankato by 1869. At that time, it was renamed the St. Paul and Sioux City Railroad. The predecessor of the Omaha Road Bridge Number 15 was completed over the Mississippi to extend the line to St. Paul. The tracks from Mendota into St. Paul were shared with the Minnesota Central Railway, a predecessor of the Milwaukee Road.

This line became Chicago, St. Paul, Minneapolis and Omaha Railway (Omaha Road) trackage. The C. St. P. M. & O. then purchased the St. Paul and Sioux City in 1881. The Omaha Road was part of the Chicago and North Western Railway. The Union Pacific acquired the C&NW.
