= Dan Patch =

American Standardbred racehorse

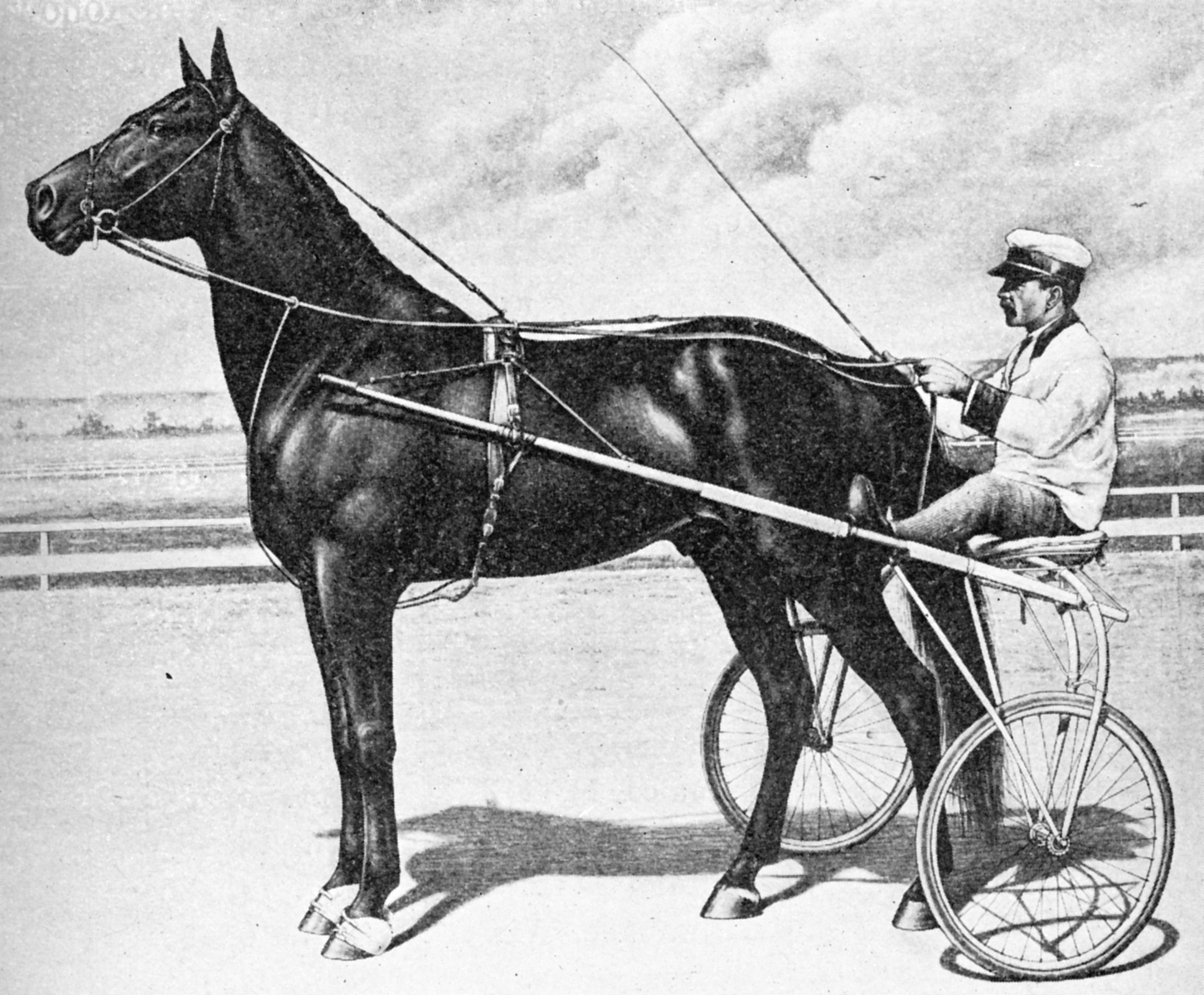
- Dan Patch in harness
- Breed: Standardbred
- Gait: Pace
- Sire: Joe Patchen
- Grandsire: Patchen Wilkes
- Dam: Zelica
- Damsire: Wilkesberry
- Sex: Stallion
- Foaled: April 29, 1896
- Died: July 11, 1916 (aged 20)
- Country: United States
- Color: Dark bay
- Breeder: Daniel Messner Jr.
- Owner: Daniel Messner Jr. Manley E. Sturges (1902); Marion Willis Savage (1902-1916)
- Record: undefeated
- Driver: John Wattles (1900); Myron McHenry (1901-1903); Harry Hersey (1904-1909)
- Mile record: 1:55 1/4 unofficially 1:55

Honors
- Harness Racing Hall of Fame Immortal (1953)
- Last updated on January 2017

Dan Patch (April 29, 1896 – July 11, 1916) was a noted American Standardbred pacer. At a time when harness racing was one of the largest sports in the nation, Dan Patch was a major celebrity. He was undefeated in open competition, and was so dominant on the racetrack that other owners eventually refused to enter their horses against him. Instead, he ended his racing career performing time trials, and traveled extensively on exhibition, earning millions of dollars in purses, attendance gate receipts, and product endorsements. Dan Patch broke world speed records at least 14 times in the early 1900s. In 1905, he set a world's record for the fastest mile by a harness horse (1 minute 55.25 seconds) that stood unmatched for over 30 years. Unofficially, Dan Patch broke this record in 1906 with a clocking of 1:55. He died on July 11, 1916. His owner, Marion Willis Savage, died just one day later.

Dan Patch was inducted into the Harness Racing Museum & Hall of Fame in 1953 and the Canadian Horse Racing Hall of Fame in 2019.

== Background ==
Dan Patch was a mahogany bay Standardbred stallion bred by Daniel (Dan) Messner Jr., a prosperous dry goods merchant from Oxford, Indiana. In late 1894, Messner purchased a three-year-old filly named Zelica for $255 (equal to $9,489 today), planning to use her as a driving horse. Zelica had gone lame in her only start and was later estimated to be worth under $100 at the time. In 1895, Messner paid a $150 stud fee to breed her to Joe Patchen, a top-quality racehorse, but untried as a sire. The resulting colt was foaled on April 29, 1896, at the livery stable in Oxford. His legs were so crooked that he could not at first stand on his own, leading many of the locals to call him "Messner's Folly". Some even suggested he be put down. Instead, Messner and his friends held the colt so he could ingest the colostrum (first milk) from Zelica. The foal's legs gradually grew straighter, although he still had crooked hocks, especially on his left hind leg. The colt developed an alert, cheerful personality and was noted for his intelligence.

In 1897, Messner applied to the American Trotting Association for the name Dan Patchen, based on his own first name and the last name of the colt's sire, with Dan P. as an alternative. Both names were taken, so the Trotting Association assigned a similar name, Dan Patch.

Zelica continued to be used as a driving horse with her colt running freely alongside until he was weaned around five or six months. At first, the young horse showed little promise. "The only redeemable feature about the little fellow was that he was friendly and cute," recalled Messner. "I honestly thought the colt's future would be confined to hauling a delivery wagon." However, a close friend named John Wattles, the owner of the livery stable in which Dan Patch was foaled, saw potential in the colt. Wattles received permission from Messner to train Dan Patch and gradually developed the horse's abilities. By late 1898, Messner was able to use Dan Patch as his driving horse, since Zelica was again in foal, and even hooked the horse up to his sleigh over the winter. The locals were increasingly impressed by the almost black colt, who loved to move fast, but was biddable enough to pull young boys behind him on the sleigh.

At maturity, Dan Patch stood 16 hands (64 inches, 163 cm) tall at the withers and weighed a "hefty" 1,165 pounds. His hindquarters were notably higher than his front. He had a short body and long legs, a combination that would have been problematic for a trotter, as the hind legs would have risked striking the front leg in full stride (known as firing). As a pacer, the risk of firing is nonexistent, as the front and hind legs on a given side move back and forth together. However, because of the crooked hock on his left hind, Dan Patch would initially "cross fire", meaning his left hind leg would sometimes hit his right fore. A special horseshoe was used on his left hind to stabilize the leg, resulting in a smooth, rhythmical stride. The left leg would still sometimes "paddle" wide though, striking the wheel of the training cart. Wattles resolved this problem by designing a wider sulky.

=== Ownership ===
Messner was the owner of a dry-goods store in Oxford and traveled extensively as a buyer of clothing and fabrics and other items for his growing business. During these trips, he frequently went to the harness races and probably made small bets with his friends. Despite his long-standing interest in the sport, Zelica was the first horse he ever owned.

In 1902, Messner sold Dan Patch to Manley E. Sturges (sometimes spelled Sturgis) of New York, for a record $20,000. Sturges first became interested in Dan Patch in 1901 when he placed a large bet on the horse in a race at Brighton Beach. Sturges was the part owner and operator of an illegal, but highly profitable, casino in Manhattan, the Victoria Club. Although the casino was frequently raided, Sturges was never arrested and maintained a low profile. He made his first offer for Dan Patch in the summer of 1901, and was finally successful in February 1902. At that time, Messner cited many reasons for the sale, including the record price and the pressure of running his store. Years later, however, Messner said that he had felt threatened by Sturges. A two-year-old daughter of Dan Patch died suddenly in February 1902, apparently from poisoning, and Messner believed that Sturges was responsible.

In turn, Sturges sold Dan Patch in December 1902 to Marion Willis Savage, a resident of Hamilton (later Savage) Minnesota, for the then unheard of price of $60,000 (equivalent to $2,230,000 in 2025). Savage was the owner of the International Stock Food Company, which specialized in feed supplements for animals, and used the horse to advertise the business. Savage took great pride in his champion and was reported as saying he loved Dan Patch like a son. When not on exhibition, Dan Patch lived in Minnesota, either in the stable of Savage's Minneapolis mansion or at Savage's sprawling farm in Hamilton in an extravagant stable known as the "Taj Mahal".

== Racing career ==
Dan Patch made his first start as a four-year-old in 1900. At the time, harness races consisted of multiple heats – a horse had to win a majority of heats (usually three out of a possible five heats) to be declared the race winner. (Note: The Little Brown Jug is a modern example of a multiple heat race.) During his career, Dan Patch never lost a race and lost only two heats. The first of those two losses occurred in his second start against what was termed "real competition" at the Lafayette Fair. In that heat, Dan Patch was last at the beginning of the homestretch and despite closing rapidly, lost by a nose. The other loss occurred in 1901 at Brighton Beach in a heat where the judges determined that the driver was "not driving to win", much to the fury of the crowd.

=== 1900: Indiana county fairs ===
Wattles began training Dan Patch in earnest at a half-mile track (0.8 km) in Templeton in 1899. Before his first start in August 1900, Dan Patch impressed Messner and Wattles with a timed mile of 2:14, a promising performance for an unprompted horse who did not seem to be working hard. On August 30, they entered him at the Boswell county fair with a purse of $250 against 2:35 horses, meaning their fastest official time was no better than the next level of 2:20. Attendance at the fair that day exceeded 8,000, boosted by a large contingent from Oxford, who wanted to see the local favorite. Dan Patch did not disappoint, winning in three straight heats in times of 2:24 1/2, 2:24 1/4 and 2:24 1/2. Wattles had not pushed the colt, wanting to be able to stay at the 2:35 level and perhaps to improve his odds in potential side bets in his upcoming races.

With only five days of rest, Dan Patch made his next start at the Lafayette Fair for a purse of $300. Although the race was still at the 2:35 level, the competition was much stiffer. With a field of nine horses, five or six horses started in the first tier, while Dan Patch started in the second tier. Dan Patch was jostled and trapped at the back of the field until Wattles finally found racing room as they entered the homestretch. Dan Patch closed rapidly but just missed in a heat timed at 2:18 1/2. Although some blamed Wattles for the loss (either due to inexperience or in an effort to drive up the odds), Wattles himself blamed it on a new harness. Regardless, Dan Patch proved his superiority by winning the next three heats, the fastest of which was completed in 2:16.

On September 12, Dan Patch took the winner's share of another purse worth $300 at the fair in Crawfordsville in three straight heats in times of 2:19 3/4, 2:20 3/4 and 2:20 1/2. The following week, the horse was asked for a little more effort in a $400 race at the Brazil fair. He responded with times of 2:16 3/4, 2:19 1/4 and 2:17 1/4. Messner had hoped to end the year at the Terre Haute fair but heavy rains forced the cancellation of the race. Dan Patch ended the year with four wins and earnings of $625.

=== 1901: the Grand Circuit ===
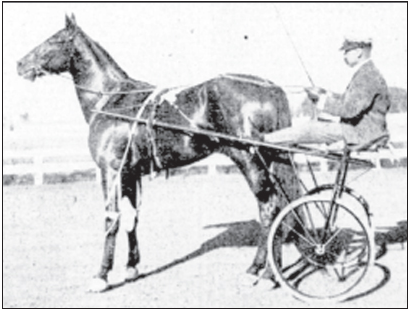
Dan Patch in 1901 with Myron McHenry. Published in the New York Daily Tribune on October 16, 1901

In 1901, Messner decided to test Dan Patch against the best horses in the country on the Grand Circuit, a series of valuable races around the north-eastern United States. Accordingly, he hired Myron McHenry to be Dan Patch's new trainer and driver. Though McHenry was reputed to be difficult to work with, his ability with horses was such that he was called "America's greatest reinsman". On May 13, Dan Patch left Oxford on a train bound for Cleveland so that McHenry could try him out. In their first drive together, Dan Patch did not appear to be working hard but the stopwatch showed he had been moving fast. McHenry reportedly said to the horse, "You're either the world's biggest counterfeit, or you're the fastest horse in the world."

McHenry worked with Dan Patch for two months before the start of the Grand Circuit season. Although he had been trained well by Wattles, he still had some gaiting issues associated with his conformation. McHenry had the toe of Dan Patch's feet trimmed short while using a shoe that was raised in the back, a combination that some observers said made the horse look like he was wearing high heels. Despite the odd appearance, the shoeing improved on the earlier changes made by Wattles to keep Dan Patch's hind legs from interfering with his front legs while reducing the wide action that led to him sometimes striking the wheels of the sulky. Always a natural pacer who required no hobbles or special equipment to keep him on stride, Dan Patch soon attracted interest from observers of the training sessions.

He made his first start with McHenry at the racetrack in Windsor, Ontario, on July 10 in a race for 2:15 level pacers. With a purse of $600, the race was meant to serve as a modest test for a horse whose official best time was 2:16. Dan Patch won in three straight heats, the fastest of which was completed in 2:07 1/2.

On July 17 in Detroit, he made his first start on the Grand Circuit at the Grosse Pointe racetrack. Although he faced some steep competition, he again won easily in straight heats. The Grand Circuit continued in Cleveland, Columbus, and Buffalo with Dan Patch continuing to build his reputation with one win after the other. In the Buffalo race, McHenry took Dan Patch to the back of the field in one of the heats, then unleashed him in the stretch. He responded with a final quarter mile in 30 seconds, a noteworthy fraction at a time when only one pacer had ever broken the two-minute barrier for the mile. McHenry told reporters, "Dan Patch is the best pacer I've ever drawn a rein over."

Dan Patch made his next start on August 16 at the Brighton Beach racetrack in New York City, known as a gambling hotbed. He was the heavy favorite to win the race, but his odds to win the first heat drifted up from 3/5 to 5/4, attracting a "mad scramble" from bettors looking to cash in. The start of the first heat was delayed by over an hour due to an equipment malfunction. When the race began, Dan Patch went to the early lead but was then eased back. In the homestretch, he was given "modest" encouragement but failed to close enough ground, finishing fourth. Bettors were incensed, believing McHenry did not drive to win, possibly after having tipped the bookmakers given the way the odds changed before the race. The time for the heat was 2:09, two seconds slower than Dan Patch's best time to date. McHenry stated that he had held back because he had heard that the winner was fast and he wanted to see how things sorted out. Some reports say the judges paid no attention to the "improbable" result. However, the Boston Globe reported that the judges were "very displeased" and others reported on a heated meeting of the officials and a near riot by the fans.

In the second heat, Dan Patch won in a time of 2:04 1/2, a new personal best. Because of the delay in the start of the first heat and another delay due to protests over its result, the third heat was not run until the next day. Dan Patch again won easily, this time in 2:07 1/4 before winning the fourth and final heat in 2:05 3/4.

His next start was at the Readville racetrack in Boston on August 22. The Globe reporter noted that Dan Patch was clearly superior to the field while the race result would be "as close as McHenry cares to draw the finishes." No betting was allowed, and Dan Patch won easily in straight heats. Following the race, he developed a cough but still raced on August 30 at the Narragansett Trotting Park in Cranston, Rhode Island on August 30. Pushed in the first heat to a time of 2:04 1/2, he won the next two heats and was reported to have made a deep bow to the crowd after the race.

Dan Patch followed up with routine wins in Hartford, Cincinnati, Lexington, and Memphis. All told, he won 12 races in 1901. He was supposed to finish the season at the Terre Haute meet, but no one would enter against him. Instead, he returned home on November 2. On November 14, Oxford held the first "Dan Patch Day", in which the horse was led around town to the tune of the newly written "Dan Patch Two Step".

=== 1902: new ownership ===
Dan Patch started 1902 in Indiana with his backers speculating just how fast he could go, as he had thus far only paced as hard as needed to win. The Oxford Tribune wrote, "It does not seem possible to those of our town who see this beautiful stallion, as gentle as a Newfoundland dog, driven about every fine day for exercise, that they are looking at the pacing king of the world." Townsfolk hoped that "Daniel" would be able to attend the upcoming Fourth of July celebrations.

In a surprising development, Dan Patch was sold to Manley Sturges in February, and was relocated to New York with McHenry remaining as his driver. His first start of the year was in Windsor, Ontario, in a match race against Canadian pacer Harold H., followed by races in Grosse Pointe and Cleveland on the Grand Circuit. In these wins, he was so dominant that subsequently either owners refused to race their horses against him or tracks were unwilling to allow betting. Sturges's only alternative was to have Dan Patch compete against the clock in exhibition races. Dan Patch paced his first public time trial on August 2 in Columbus and made headlines by surpassing the mark of his sire with a time of 2:00 3/4. This was second only to Star Pointer's world record of 1:59 1/4, a time that now looked achievable.

Over the summer and fall, interest in Dan Patch continued to grow, with racetracks negotiating with McHenry to have the horse appear. Dan Patch paced a mile in 2:00 3/4 at Brighton Beach despite high winds, then lowered his personal best to 2:00 1/2 at Readville. On August 29, Dan Patch just missed the world record with a time of 1:59 1/2 at Providence. After strong attempts in Philadelphia, Syracuse and Empire City, Dan Patch finally tied Star Pointer's world record on September 29 at Readville. He rounded out the year with exhibitions before enormous crowds at Cincinnati, Terre Haute, Davenport and Memphis.

Marion Savage became one of Dan Patch's biggest fans and made multiple offers to Sturges for the horse. Savage finally succeeded in December with an offer of $60,000, then a staggering amount.

=== 1903: "champion harness horse of the world" ===
Savage was known for his advertising skills and soon capitalized on Dan Patch's growing fame. Rather than charging an exhibition fee, Savage received a proportion of the gate receipts for crowds that grew to between 40 and 50 thousand. In most of his exhibition races, Dan Patch started behind galloping horses who were hooked up to a sulky, which gave Dan Patch a target to beat and also acted as a wind breaker. The pace makers would eventually swing wide, leaving Dan Patch alone against the clock.

Not long after buying Dan Patch, Savage entered him in the Minneapolis Riding and Driving Club's winter horse show held on January 29, 1903. The "champion harness horse of the world" was given the chance to show his paces on a snowy Park avenue. Savage scheduled other special appearances for Dan Patch throughout the spring before finally handing him over to McHenry for serious training in June. Dan Patch made his first major appearance of 1903 in a time trial at Columbus on July 17. Despite being short of conditioning and pacing into a headwind, Dan Patch tied Prince Alert's world record for the half mile of 57 3/4 seconds. Although far less famous, Prince Alert was the only other active horse to have broken the two minute barrier for the mile and might have given Dan Patch a serious battle had the two ever met head to head. Instead, the two tried to outdo each other racing against the clock.

Dan Patch's next notable achievement was on August 19 at Brighton Beach, where he broke the world record by pacing a mile in 1:59 despite cold and windy conditions. This was the first time the race format had used galloping Thoroughbreds to prompt the pace, with one running beside Dan Patch at the start and the other behind. The effort was nearly derailed when Dan Patch came close to clipping the rail when moving into the first turn, while his running mates swept wide and were left behind. Dan Patch completed the half-mile in :59 1/4 before one of the pacemakers caught up, then moved in front. His time for the three-quarters was 1:29 1/4, just off of world record pace. McHenry urged Dan Patch hard down the homestretch and he responded with a final quarter mile in under 30 seconds to set the record.

Dan Patch next tackled the record for one mile on a half-mile track. Because the horse must negotiate more and tighter turns on a smaller track, the half-mile track record is slower than the time on a one-mile track. Even today, separate records are kept in harness racing depending on the track dimensions. On September 7 at the half-mile track in Lima, Ohio, Dan Patch paced a world record of 2:04, only to have the record broken by Prince Alert a few weeks later. Prince Alert then lowered the world record on a one-mile track to an astonishing 1:57, thanks in part to perfect weather conditions but also aided by a large canvas sail carried between the galloping horses who set the pace. Critics pointed out that the sail, later referred to as a wind shield, lessened the wind resistance that a horse faced (similar to drafting in cycling or motor racing). Although the usage of wind shields was eventually disallowed by the American Trotting Register, in the short term it meant that Dan Patch was no longer the fastest harness horse in the world.

Dan Patch responded to the challenge by setting a flurry of records. In Lexington, he broke the existing record for pacing while attached to a wagon, instead of the lighter, more aerodynamic sulky, by over two seconds. A week later in Memphis, he regained the one mile world from Prince Alert with a time of 1:56 1/4, an accomplishment that made the first page of the New York Times. Dan Patch maintained a steady pace, completing the first quarter mile in 29 seconds, the first half in 58 seconds and the three-quarters in 1:37 1/4. McHenry had used only a small canvas strip between the wheels of his pacemaker's sulky that McHenry called a dust shield, compared to the much larger wind shield carried between two pacemakers used by Prince Alert.

On October 27 while still in Memphis, he set two world records within 45 minutes of each other. In the first trial, he lowered the record for the half mile from 57 1/2 seconds to 56 seconds flat. In the second, he lowered his own record for a mile pacing to wagon from 1:59 1/4 to 1:57 1/4.

Dan Patch made two further appearances in 1903. At Birmingham, Alabama on November 10, he lowered the record for a mile on a half mile track to 2:03 1/4, even though his pacemaker had moved too far ahead to act as a proper windshield. The conditions in Macon, Georgia on November 30 were cold and windy but Dan Patch still set two world records within an hour of each other. In the first, he was attached to an old-fashioned high-wheeled sulky and lowered the existing record by 1 1/4 seconds. In the second, he paced two miles in 4:17, lowering the existing record by two seconds.

=== 1904: on the road ===
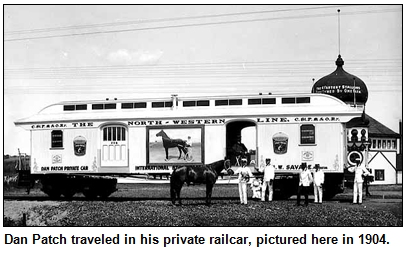
Dan Patch before his private rail car, circa 1904

In 1904, Savage split company with McHenry, who had been Dan Patch's trainer and driver since 1901. A variety of reasons were cited, including McHenry's drinking and his complaints that Savage was treating Dan Patch like a circus act. Savage replaced McHenry with Harry Hersey, who had been the manager of Savage's farm in Minnesota but had little race-driving experience. Savage had no inclination to test Dan Patch in competitive formats, where even the fastest horse can lose due to a variety of factors. Instead, Savage used Dan Patch to promote the horse feed supplements his company produced and, in the model of Buffalo Bill Cody's Wild West Show, turned each appearance by Dan Patch into a major event. Dan Patch was shipped in a custom built rail-car, with half of the space reserved for Dan Patch and the other half for his grooms and the horses used as prompters. Savage estimated that Dan Patch traveled roughly 10,000 miles in 1904 alone.

Dan Patch did not make his seasonal debut for 1904 until August 11 in Indianapolis and his first performances were considered disappointing, well off his personal best. Despite this, the crowds though continued to grow, reaching 40,000 in Des Moines and 50,000 in Milwaukee. He was then scheduled to make an appearance in Topeka on the September 14 and arrived in town a few days early. After a workout on the 12th, he cooled out normally but later started to show signs of distress. The condition quickly deteriorated and a respected veterinarian diagnosed a strangulated hernia, which had a very high fatality rate at the time since abdominal surgery on horses was not then an option. Hersey sent two telegraphs on hearing the news: one to Savage and the other to the Minneapolis Journal. While Savage rushed to Dan Patch's side, news went out across America that the horse was dying.

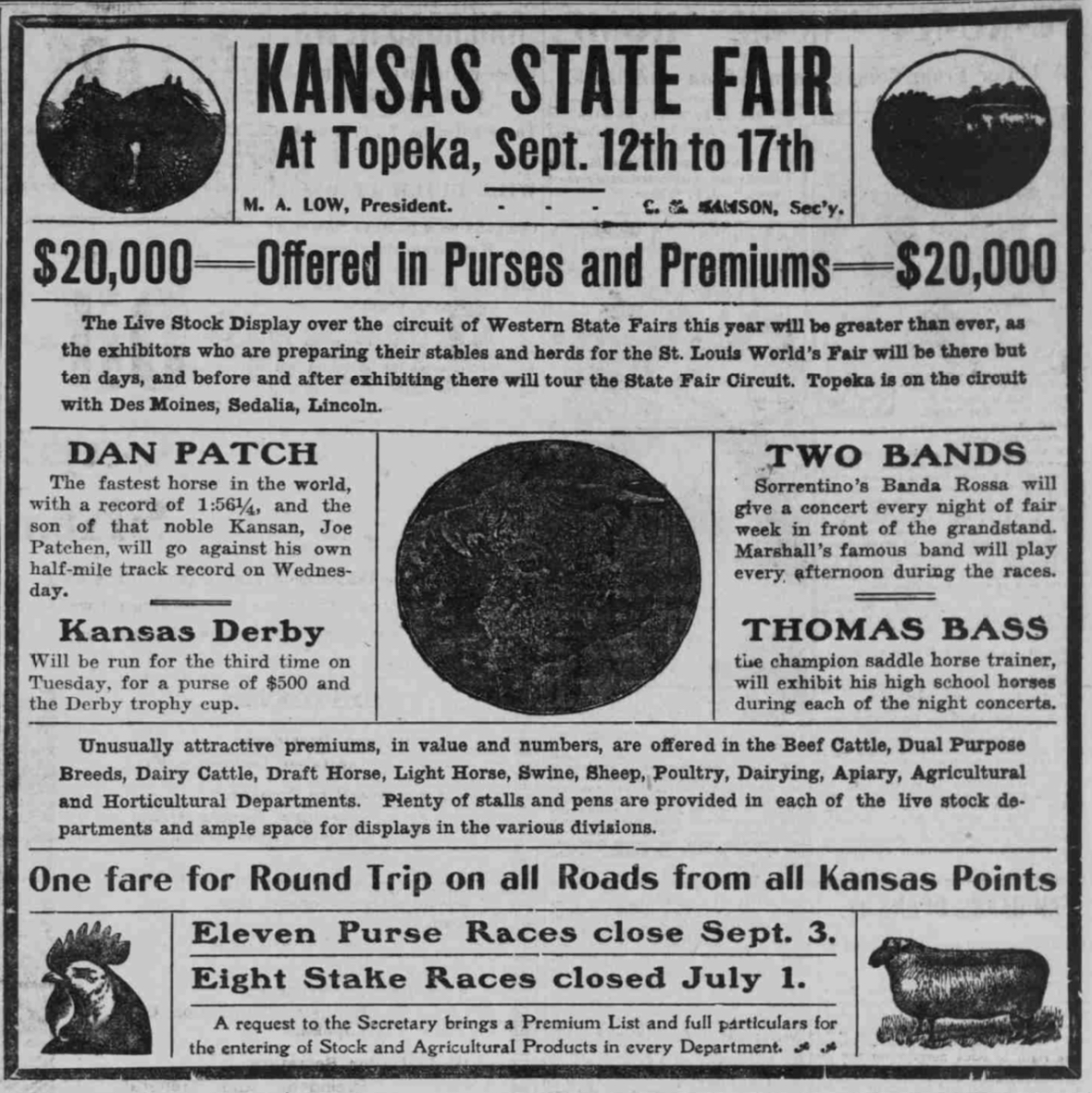
1904 Kansas State Fair advertisement

On his arrival in Kansas on the 13th, Savage called in other veterinarians, one of whom felt that the condition was actually an impacted bowel – still serious but much more survivable. For the next few days, newspapers updated on Dan Patch's slowly improving condition until the horse was finally pronounced out of danger on September 29. Savage had administered triple doses of "International Colic Cure", one of his company's feed supplements, and later said this helped Dan Patch's recovery, though he did not claim that it actually cured the colic. Some skeptics wondered if Savage had manufactured the crisis for the resulting publicity, though this seems unlikely since he was not present when the horse first became ill. Dan Patch made a brief appearance before the crowd in Topeka before being shipped home to Minnesota. He was given a brief time off before attending a previously scheduled event on October 7 at the Illinois State Fair, where 50,000 people turned out to see the "national pet".

His next scheduled appearance was in Memphis, Tennessee, where little was expected of him due to the recent illness. On October 24, he paced a mile without prompters in 2:00 1/4, the fastest time paced that year despite appearing "dull and weak" to his old owner Manley Sturges. Just two days later though, Dan Patch returned in much better condition. Behind his galloping prompter, he paced the first quarter mile in 29 seconds and completed the first half in 57 1/2 seconds. He seemed to falter around the far turn, but still completed the three-quarters in 1:26 1/2. In the stretch, he recovered his best stride and completed the mile in a new world record of 1:56. He was greeted with an ovation and Hersey was carried from the sulky on the way back to the stands.

Dan Patch finished the year with appearances in St. Louis, Oklahoma City and Dallas. At Oklahoma City, he broke his own record for one mile on a half-mile track with a time of 2:03, despite "dreadful" track conditions that caused Dan Patch to nearly fall. Hersey said, "It was the most wonderful mile ever paced by a horse." The crowd concurred – according to a reporter, "Canes, hats, and coats filled the air."

=== 1905: the Black Whirlwind ===
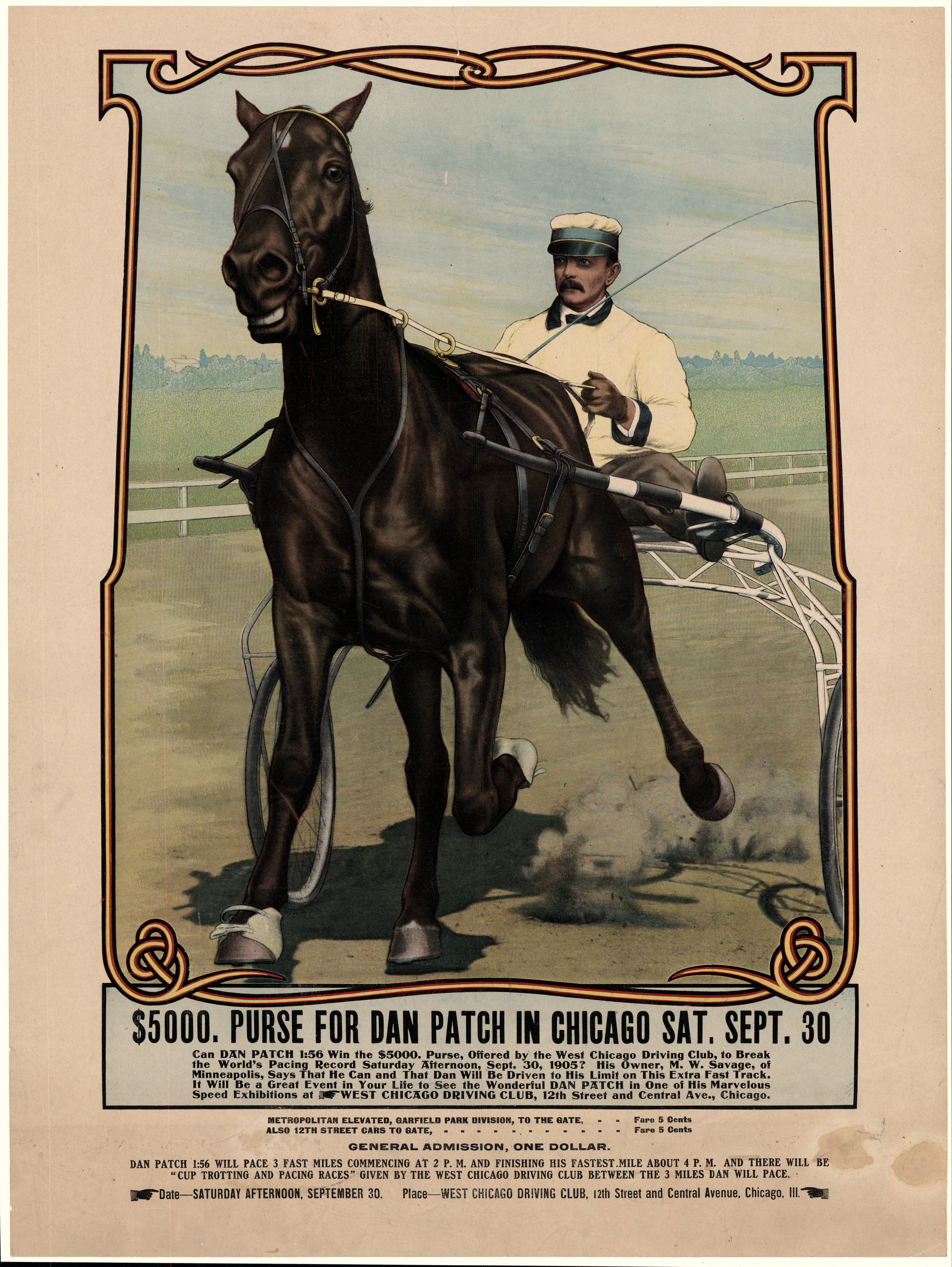
Advertisement for a Dan Patch race in Chicago (1905). Hennepin County Library collection.

Dan Patch celebrated his ninth birthday in 1905, an age at which racehorses are considered past their prime. From this point onward, the expectation that he would set a new record on any given trial was lower, but the horse's popularity remained intact. Dan Patch made his first appearance of the year in September at the Minnesota State Fair before a crowd of 98,000, followed by a crowd of 55,000 at Indianapolis and more than 100,000 in Allentown. He then shipped to Lexington, where he tied his own world record of 1:56 while surrounded by a cloud of dust, leading the New York Times to call him the "Black Whirlwind". Two days later, Dan Patch outdid himself, setting his official record of 1:55 1/4, a time that would remain a record for over 30 years.

Savage then decided to tackle the record for an unprompted mile, which still stood at 1:59 1/4. The harness racing community was becoming increasingly concerned about the use of prompters and wind shields, so Savage wished to establish that Dan Patch could break Star Pointer's old record without assistance. After several attempts that were close to or matched that time, Dan Patch finally shattered the "in the open" record with a time of 1:58 at Memphis on November 11.

=== 1906-1909: celebrity ===
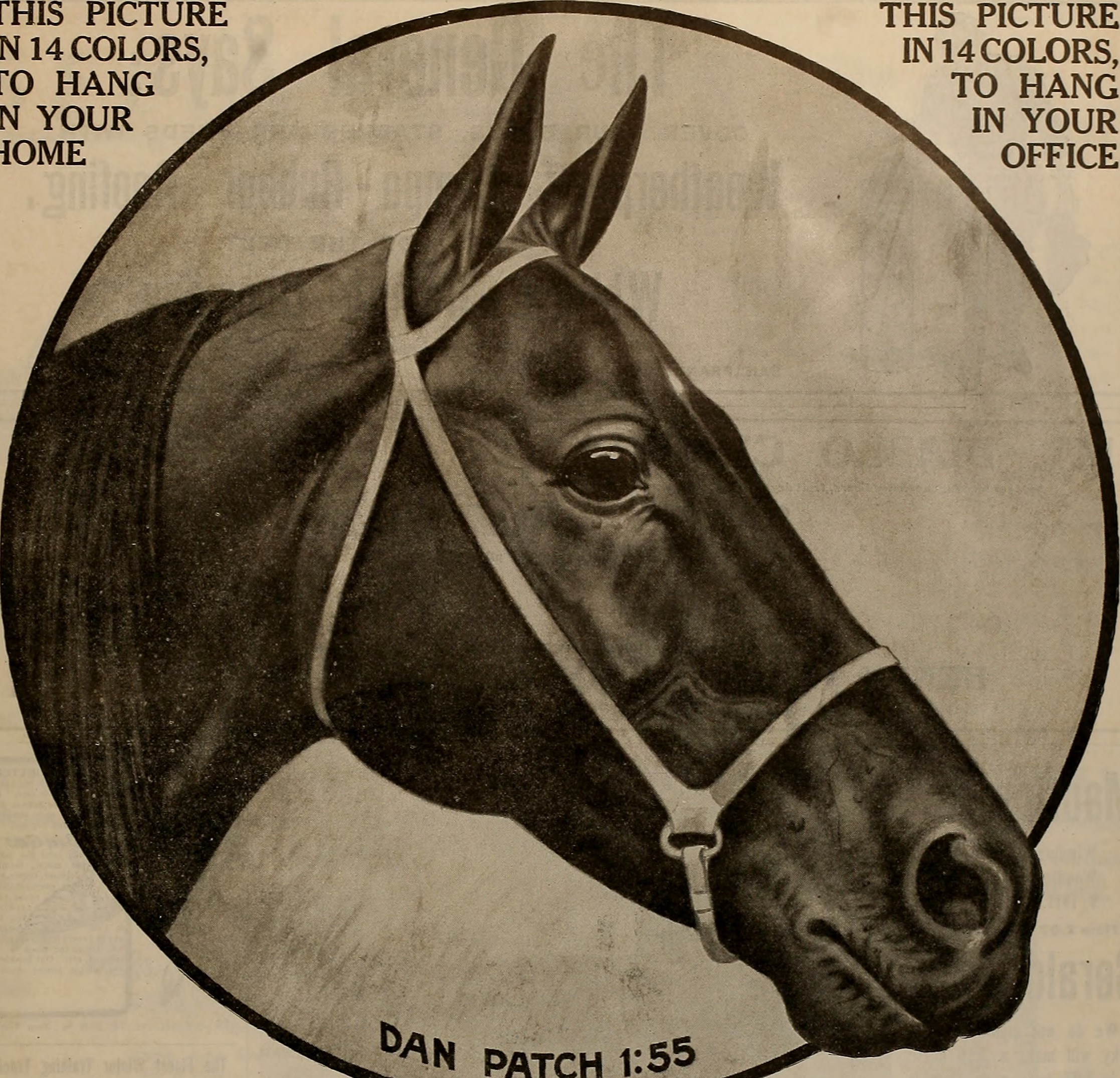
Dan Patch 1:55, an advertisement from Breeder and Sportsman (1911)

In 1906, the National Trotting Association banned the use of wind shields, although they did allow Dan Patch's 1905 records to stand. Thus, his official best mile is 1:55 1/4. Unofficially, his best time was 1:55, paced in September 1906 at the Minnesota State Fair. Savage was so indignant about the 1:55 mark not being recognized that he renamed his International Stock Food Farm to the International 1:55 Stock Food Farm. Savage later used Dan Patch and his offspring in ads for the farm, with the 1:55 time clearly included. The 1:55 mark was equaled in following years but was not broken until 1960, 54 years after Dan Patch's run, when Adios Butler paced the first sub-1:55 mile in 1:54:3.

Although Dan Patch continued to make public appearances and posted some excellent times, he was never able to achieve that level again. The closest he came was on October 11, 1908, at Lexington, when he paced the first three-quarters of a mile in an exceptional 1:25 1/2 before his prompter started bleeding and slowed down. Dan Patch was forced to check but still finished the mile in 1:56 1/4. Savage advertised that Dan Patch would otherwise have finished in 1:54, which "the Horse Papers and all Horsemen admit was the Fastest and Greatest Performance in the life of the World Famous Harness Horse King."

Dan Patch's achievements made him a sports celebrity, possibly the most famous athlete in America until Babe Ruth. His name and likeness were used to sell a vast array of merchandise including whiskey bottles, shot glasses, cigars, coffee, billiard cues, sheet music, chewing tobacco, toothpicks, playing cards, liniments, stable disinfectants, knives, washing machines, sewing machines, and manure spreaders. At the height of his fame, he earned more than $1 million a year for his owner and was billed as "kindhearted, generous, and a staunch Methodist who never performed on a Sunday."

Among the hundreds of thousands of people who turned out for a glimpse of the horse over his career was Dwight Eisenhower, who lined up with his parents at the 1904 Kansas State Fair. Harry Truman recalled that as a boy he had written a fan letter to the horse.

== Records set ==
Date	Location	Distance	Format	Time	Reference
Sep 29, 1902	Readville	1 mile	Time trial (unprompted)	1:59 1/4 tied Star Pointer's world record	
Jul 17, 1903	Columbus	1/2 mile	Time trial	:57 3/4 tied Prince Alert's world record	
Aug 19, 1903	Brighton Beach	1 mile	Time trial	1:59	
Sep 7, 1903	Lima, Ohio	1 mile on half-mile track	Time trial	2:04	
Oct 1903	Lexington	1 mile	Pacing to wagon	1:59 1/4	
Oct 1903	Memphis	1 mile	Time trial	1:56 1/4	
Oct 29, 1903	Memphis	1/2 mile	Time trial	:56 flat	
Oct 29, 1903	Memphis	1 mile	Pacing to wagon	1:57 1/4	
Nov 10, 1903	Birmingham	1 mile on half-mile track	Time trial	2:03 1/4	
Nov 30, 1903	Macon	1 mile	High-wheeled sulky	2:04 3/4	
Nov 30, 1903	Macon	2 miles	Time trial	4:19	
Oct 26, 1904	Memphis	1 mile	Time trial	1:56	
Nov 1904	Oklahoma City	1 mile on half-mile track	Time trial	2:03 flat	
Oct 5, 1905	Lexington	1 mile	Time trial	1:56 tied own world record	
Oct 7, 1905	Lexington	1 mile	Time Trial	1:55 1/4	
Nov 11, 1905	Memphis	1 mile	Time Trial (unprompted)	1:58	
Sep 8, 1906	Minnesota State Fair	1 mile	Time Trial	1:55 (unofficial)	

== Retirement ==
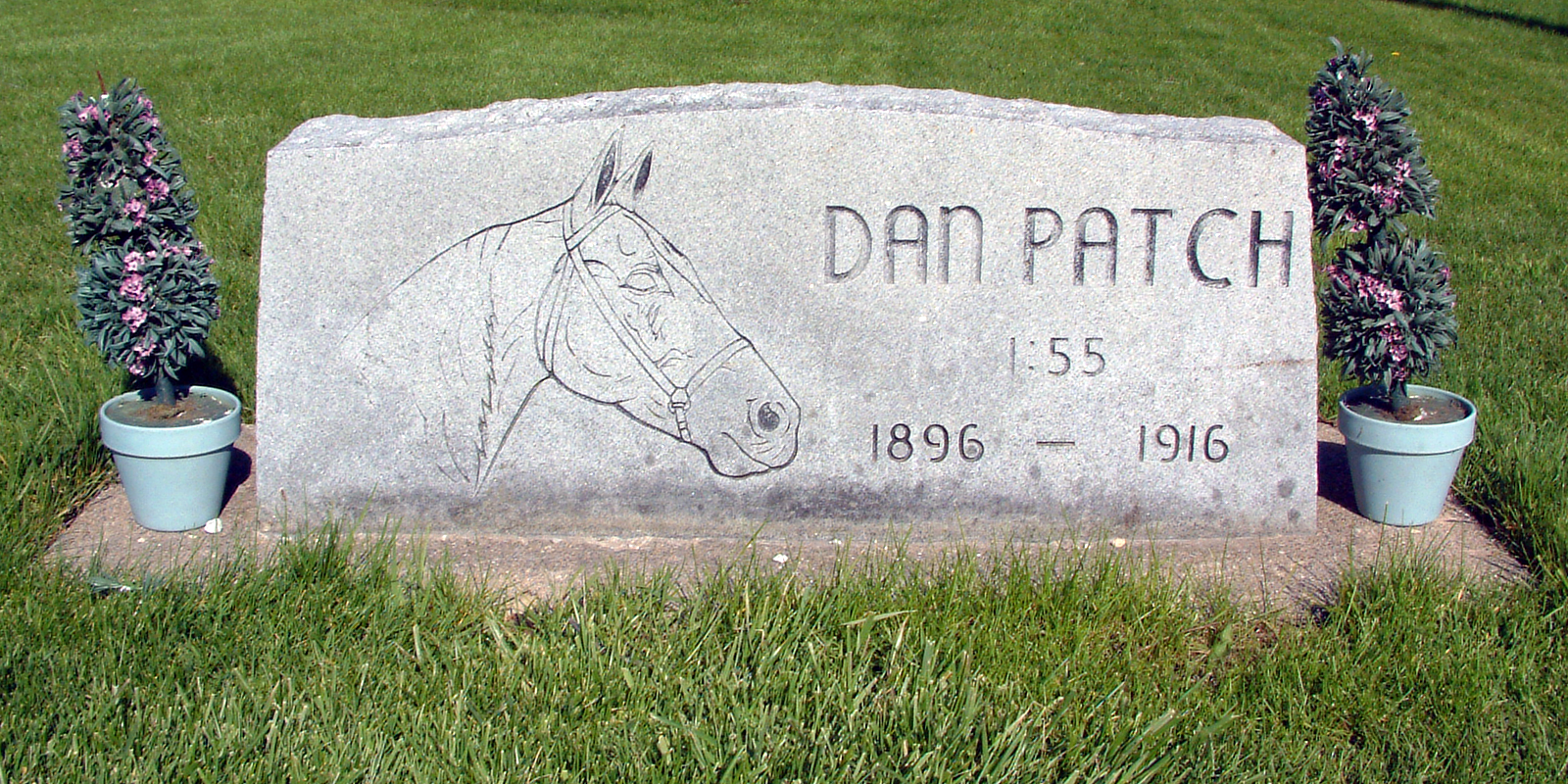
The tombstone memorial of Dan Patch in Oxford, Indiana.

Dan Patch retired undefeated in 1909 as the holder of nine world records, and spent much of his later life attending exhibitions. Even during his racing career, he was used for stallion duty with a stud fee of between $300 and $500, though he was never exposed to the best mares. He had a moderately successful stud career but never sired a horse close to his ability. He sired 38 trotters who met the 2m:30s standard with 1 breaking 2:10. He also sired 138 pacers who met the standard, 5 of whom broke the 2:05 barrier. Dazzle Patch was his most successful son but died young and left only a few foals behind. Dan Patch's name is rare in modern pedigrees. His most famous descendant is Hall of Famer Jate Lobell, who traces to Dan Patch's daughter Theda Patch in the female line.

In July 1916, Savage went into the hospital for minor hemorrhoid surgery. At the same time, Dan Patch suffered an attack of colic, from which he soon seemed to recover. However, at 10:00 AM on July 11, Dan Patch collapsed, thrashed his legs in a pacing motion and then died of a massive heart attack. Savage was notified and indicated that he wished to have Dan Patch stuffed and mounted. Before this could be done, Savage died on July 12 of a pulmonary embolism.

== Memorials ==
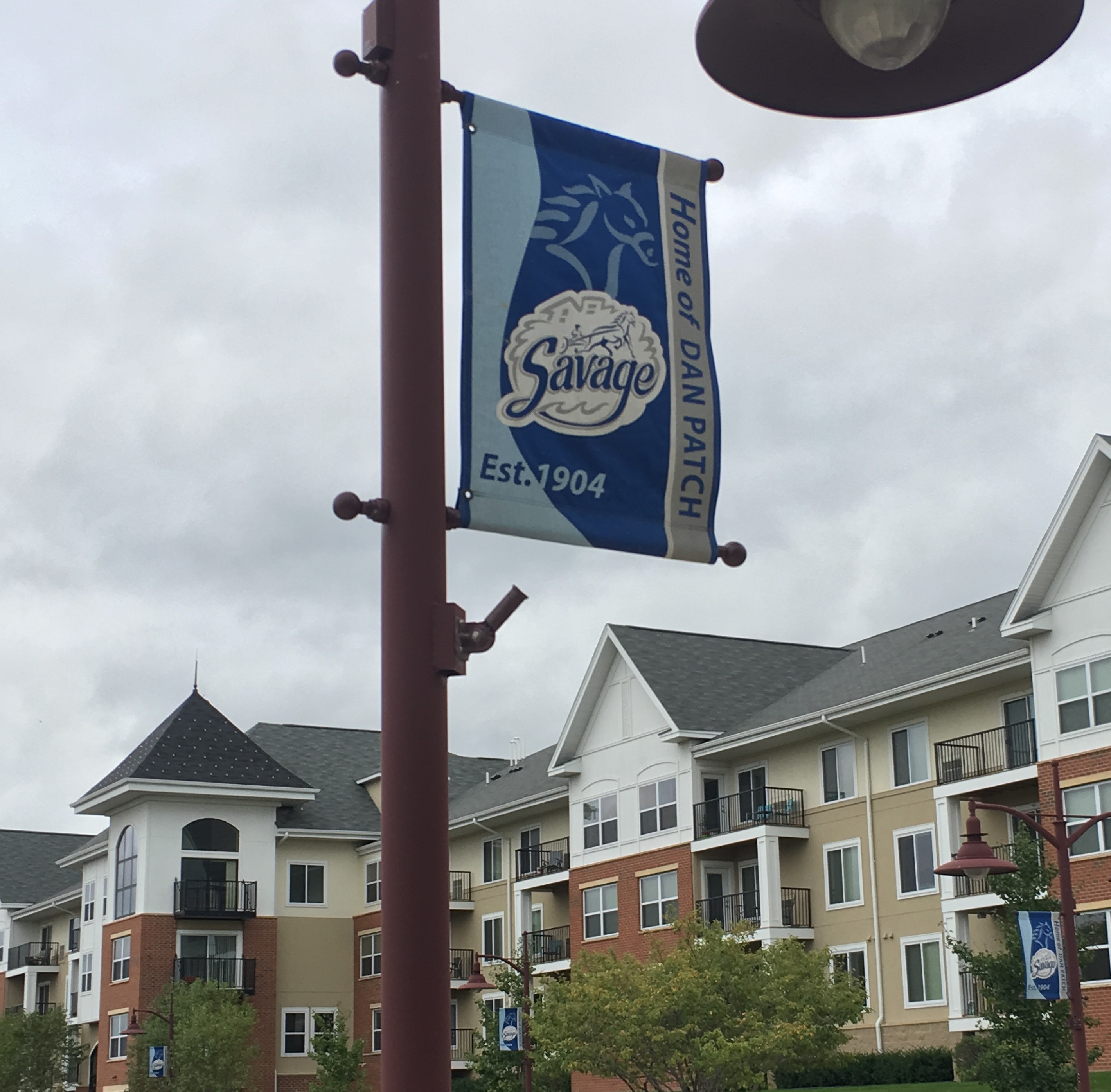
Banners commemorating Dan Patch on lampposts in Savage, Minnesota

Dan Patch is believed to be buried somewhere on the "Taj Mahal" property in an unmarked grave – the tombstone in Oxford is just a memorial. Dan Patch's home town of Oxford continues to honor the horse at its annual "Dan Patch Days" festival, a festival that is scheduled for the weekend following Labor Day each year. Savage, Minnesota, also holds a celebration called "Dan Patch Days" annually in June.

Today, the land in Savage formerly occupied by the Taj Mahal stables and racetracks is vacant, though the outline of a track is visible from the air, near the intersection of State Highway 13 and Vernon Avenue. The land is posted "no trespassing" and no historical marker documents that anything of significance ever stood there.

In 1953, Dan Patch was inducted in the new Harness Racing Museum & Hall of Fame.

The City of Savage, Minnesota, was renamed for Dan Patch's owner, Marion Willis Savage, in 1904. Dan Patch Avenue on the Minnesota State Fair grounds is named for the horse. Dan Patch Drive and Dan Patch Lane in Savage, Minnesota, are also named after Dan Patch.

In 1992, the Dan Patch Historical Society was formed to "collect, preserve and disseminate information about the horse". In 1997, it helped set up a Heritage Room in the Savage Public Library, which contains two display cases of Dan Patch memorabilia and extensive records.

In 2004, Prior Lake High School, located in Savage, named its new stadium after the horse.

In 2019, Dan Patch was named into the Canadian Horse Racing Hall of Fame.

In a display on the exterior of the Indiana State Museum, Benton County (where Dan Patch's hometown of Oxford is located) is represented by a wire sculpture of Dan Patch. The road into Oxford is named the Dan Patch highway and there are several tributes to the horse including an historical marker showing his birthplace.

== Cultural references ==
The brass era automobile maker Dan Patch was founded in Minneapolis in 1911. The company was owned by Savage and was one of 16 manufacturers in Minnesota at the time. This operation came to an end when the Ford Motor Company began its assembly operations in St. Paul.

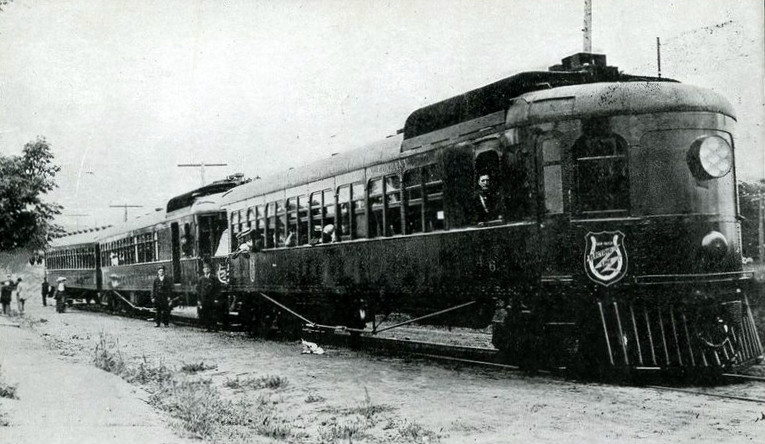
A Dan Patch Railway train, circa 1915.

The proposed Dan Patch Corridor commuter rail line in southern Minnesota runs along the tracks of the former Dan Patch line, created in 1907 by Marion W. Savage. Passenger service on the Dan Patch line began the summer of 1910, with travel from Bloomington, Minnesota to Minneapolis. Savage's plan of running rail through to Iowa never materialized as the citizens of Faribault, Minnesota would have nothing to do with it. The railroad was declared bankrupt in 1917 and purchased a year later. Savage's track however would spur growth along all the cities it lay and service industries like Ford, John Deere and Thermo King.

Dan Patch Toastmasters, Club 1280 of Toastmasters International, was founded in 1954, and continues to meet on Wednesday evenings in Richfield, Minnesota.

The song "Ya Got Trouble", from the 1957 Broadway musical and 1962 film The Music Man, makes a reference to the horse in expounding upon the "degradation" of jockeys sitting on the horse during a race, when Harold Hill (Robert Preston) states:

Not a wholesome trottin' race, No, but a race where they set down right on the horse!

Like to see some stuck-up jockey boy sittin' on Dan Patch?

Make your blood boil?

Well, I should say!

Dan Patch was the subject of the 1949 motion picture The Great Dan Patch starring Dennis O'Keefe and Gail Russell.

The Disney movie So Dear to My Heart features Dan Patch's train pulling into a small town. Jeremiah's black lamb, Danny, is named for the horse and serves as his inspiration.

== Pedigree ==
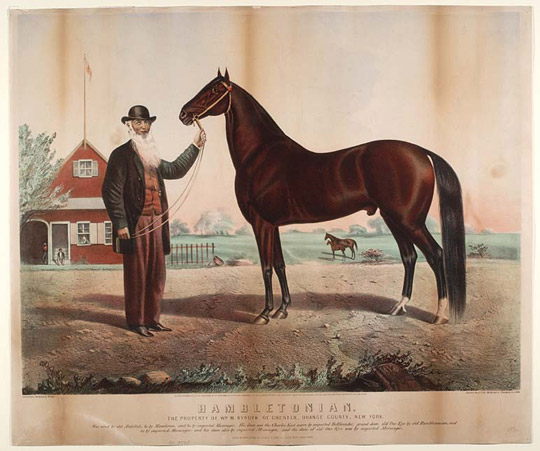
Hambletonian 10, a founding sire of the Standardbred

In 1879, the harness racing community established "The Standard", which stated that a Standardbred was a horse who either: (a) could trot a mile in 2:30, (Note: The current standard is 2:20 for a two-year-old and 2:15 for a three-year-old.) or (b) was the offspring of such a horse. Both Dan Patch's parents were Standardbreds but further back in his pedigree are a significant number of Morgan horses. Even further back can be found Thoroughbreds (most notably Messenger, the great-grandfather of Hambletonian) and a wide variety of harness horse breeds including the Narragansett Pacer, Canadian Pacer, Norfolk Trotter and Hackney.

Dan Patch was from the first crop of Joe Patchen, one of the fastest pacers of his time. Joe Patchen's main rival was Star Pointer, the first Standardbred to break the two minute barrier. Joe Patchen was a great-grandson of Standardbred foundation sire Hambletonian (known more fully as Hambletonian 10 or Rysdyk's Hambletonian to distinguish him from the Thoroughbred of the same name). Hambletonian sired 40 trotters who met the standard, with several going on to be influential sires. His son George Wilkes raced for twelve years, winning 29 of 67 races. Known for his ill temper, he was initially greeted with indifference at stud but soon became one of the greatest sires of his age. One of George Wilkes's less distinguished sons was Patchen Wilkes, who barely met the standard with a best time of 2:29 1/4. Patchen Wilkes's only important offspring was a colt produced by the half Morgan, half Standardbred mare Josephine Young and named Joe Patchen after his parents. Though mixed, Joe Patchen was a great pacer with a career best of 2:01 1/4. This likely had a great deal to do with Josephine Young's sire being trotter Joe Young (2:18), a successful racing horse from Peabody, Kansas. Other than Dan Patch, Joe Patchen was not a great success at stud.

Dan Patch's dam Zelica was sired by Wilkesberry, also a grandson of George Wilkes through one of his best sons, Young Jim. Wilkesberry was a talented horse who died young and left only a few foals. Zelica's dam Abdallah Belle descended from Alexander's Abdallah, a son of Hambletonian who also died young and left few survivors due to the Civil War. Zelica produced several foals after Dan Patch but they were fairly undistinguished.

Pedigree of Dan Patch, bay horse, Standardbred, 1896
Sire Joe Patchen 1889	Patchen Wilkes; 1882	George Wilkes*	Hambletonian 10*
Sire Joe Patchen 1889	Patchen Wilkes; 1882	George Wilkes*	Dolly Spanker*
Sire Joe Patchen 1889	Patchen Wilkes; 1882	Kitty Patchen	Mambrino Patchen
Sire Joe Patchen 1889	Patchen Wilkes; 1882	Kitty Patchen	Betty Brown
Sire Joe Patchen 1889	Josephine Young; 1885	Joe Young	Star of the West
Sire Joe Patchen 1889	Josephine Young; 1885	Joe Young	Lady Gregory
Sire Joe Patchen 1889	Josephine Young; 1885	Kate Moody‡	Morgan Henry‡
Sire Joe Patchen 1889	Josephine Young; 1885	Kate Moody‡	Nell‡
Dam Zelica 1891	Wilkesberry; 1888	Young Jim	George Wilkes*
Dam Zelica 1891	Wilkesberry; 1888	Young Jim	Lear Mare
Dam Zelica 1891	Wilkesberry; 1888	Madam Adams	American Clay
Dam Zelica 1891	Wilkesberry; 1888	Madam Adams	Lady Adams‡
Dam Zelica 1891	Adballah Belle; 1873	Pacing Abdallah	Alexander's Abdallah
Dam Zelica 1891	Adballah Belle; 1873	Pacing Abdallah	Lydia Talbot
Dam Zelica 1891	Adballah Belle; 1873	Fanny‡	Wells Yellow Jacket‡
Dam Zelica 1891	Adballah Belle; 1873	Fanny‡	not recorded

‡ Morgan horse

* Dan Patch is inbred 3S x 4D to the stallion George Wilkes, meaning that he appears third generation on the sire side of his pedigree, and fourth generation on the dam side of his pedigree.

== See also ==
- List of racehorses
