= Twin Cities and Western Railroad =

Railroad in Minnesota

- Twin Cities and Western Railroad trackage. Solid lines are track owned by TCWR; dotted lines are TCWR trackage rights.

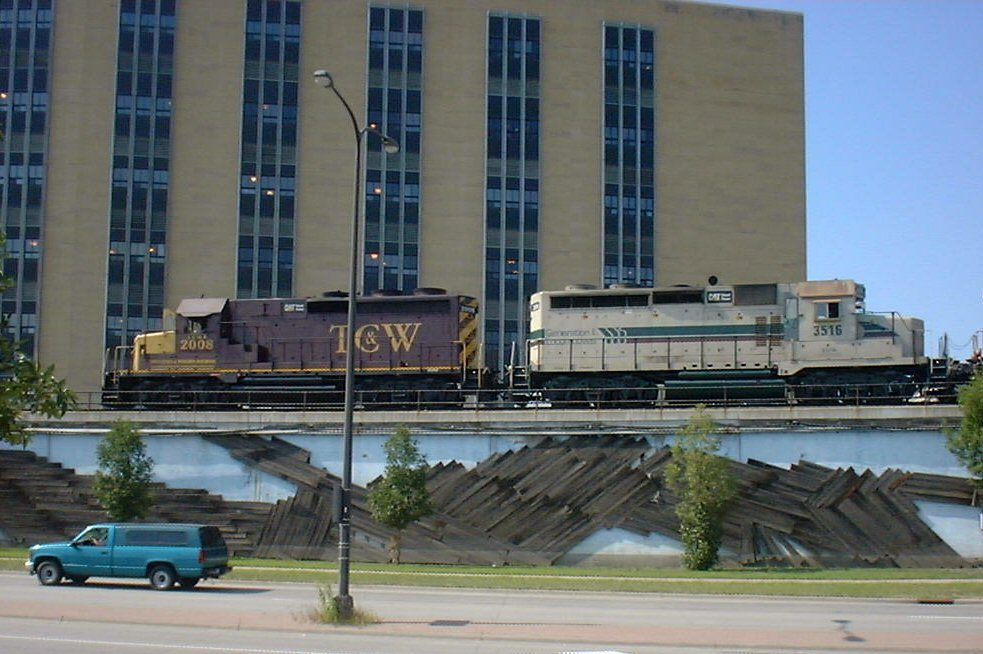
- A Twin Cities and Western Railroad train waits in downtown Saint Paul, Minnesota.

Overview
- Headquarters: Glencoe, Minnesota
- Reporting mark: TCWR
- Locale: Minnesota, South Dakota
- Dates of operation: 1991–present

Technical
- Track gauge: 4 ft 8 1/2 in (1,435 mm)
- Length: 229 miles (369 km)

Other
- Website: Official website

The Twin Cities and Western Railroad (reporting mark TCWR) is a railroad operating in the U.S. state of Minnesota which started operations on July 27, 1991. Trackage includes the former Soo Line Railroad "Ortonville Line", originally built as the first part of the Pacific extension of the Milwaukee Road. This main line extends from Hopkins, Minnesota (a Western suburb of the Twin Cities), to Appleton, Minnesota. The line was originally built between Hopkins and Cologne, Minnesota, in 1876 by Hastings and Dakota Railroad. In 1913, the Milwaukee Road rerouted it, reducing the curves. The line was eventually extended to the Pacific.

As of 1991, the TCWR also has trackage rights over the BNSF Railway and the CPKC Railway. In 2012, the TCWR purchased the Sisseton Milbank Railroad (reporting mark SMRR) and it now operates as a subsidiary of the Twin Cities and Western Railway.

The company is also affiliated with the Red River Valley and Western Railroad(reporting mark RRVW) in North Dakota, and the Minnesota Prairie Line(reporting mark MPLI), which has a junction with the Twin Cities and Western in Norwood Young America, Minnesota.

== Routing ==
Until Hiawatha Avenue (Minnesota State Highway 55) was reconstructed in the 1990s and plans for the Hiawatha Line light rail service entered late stages, the Twin Cities and Western operated on Canadian Pacific's Bass Lake Subdivision through the 29th Street railway trench in Minneapolis, now known as the Midtown Greenway. The tracks continued along the former Milwaukee Road Short Line into Saint Paul, where TC&W would access rail yards operated by Canadian Pacific, the Minnesota Commercial Railway, and others. As part of the Hiawatha project, the railroad's route to St Paul was moved from the 29th Street Corridor to the Kenilworth Corridor (former M&STL/C&NW track) to Cedar Lake Junction onto the BNSF just west of downtown Minneapolis. The re-route occurred in August 1998.

After the TC&W was re-routed onto the Kenilworth Corridor, HCRRA constructed the Kenilworth Trail adjacent to the railroad track, using railroad right-of-way acquired from the Chicago and North Western Railway by the Hennepin County Regional Railroad Authority. The Kenilworth alignment had first been built as part of the Minneapolis and St. Louis Railway and eventually became part of the Chicago and North Western Railway. The Hennepin County Regional Rail Authority acquired the land (1984?) prior to when C&NW abandoned the line (1993?) . The existing freight operation shares the corridor with the Kenilworth Trail.

The temporary alignment was only expected to last five years and was proposed as a way to preserve the route for future transit. By 2009, the connection was reaching the end of its lifespan and required rehabilitation. A rerouting of the line was re-examined in 2009 for the planned Metro Green Line Extension light-rail line. Building the connection to the MN&S Subdivision was expected to cost about $48 million. A more detailed analysis was expected to be completed by the end of 2010. Because there was no freight rail engineering study done on the planned re-route of the freight rail route, and once the freight rail engineering study was completed in 2013, the impact of a safe re-route of freight rail was determined to negatively impact the local community, therefore the local community rejected freight rail reroute plans to the MN&S Subdivision in 2014. TC&W also rejected any rerouting that took it off the Kenilworth Corridor, pointing out that plans to reroute their trains onto Canadian Pacific's MN&S Spur were unsafe. In 2018, it was agreed to allow the railroad to continue using the Kenilworth line, and plans for co-locating freight rail and light rail were made.

In order to protect a potentially important shipping route, TC&W purchased the Dan Patch Line Bridge over the Minnesota River in Savage. TC&W has trackage rights over CP's MN&S Subdivision to reach Savage, and as of the fall of 2022, was seeking state funding to rehabilitate a section of track in Savage that would allow direct service to Port Cargill and neighboring grain elevators to resume.

== Motive power and operations ==
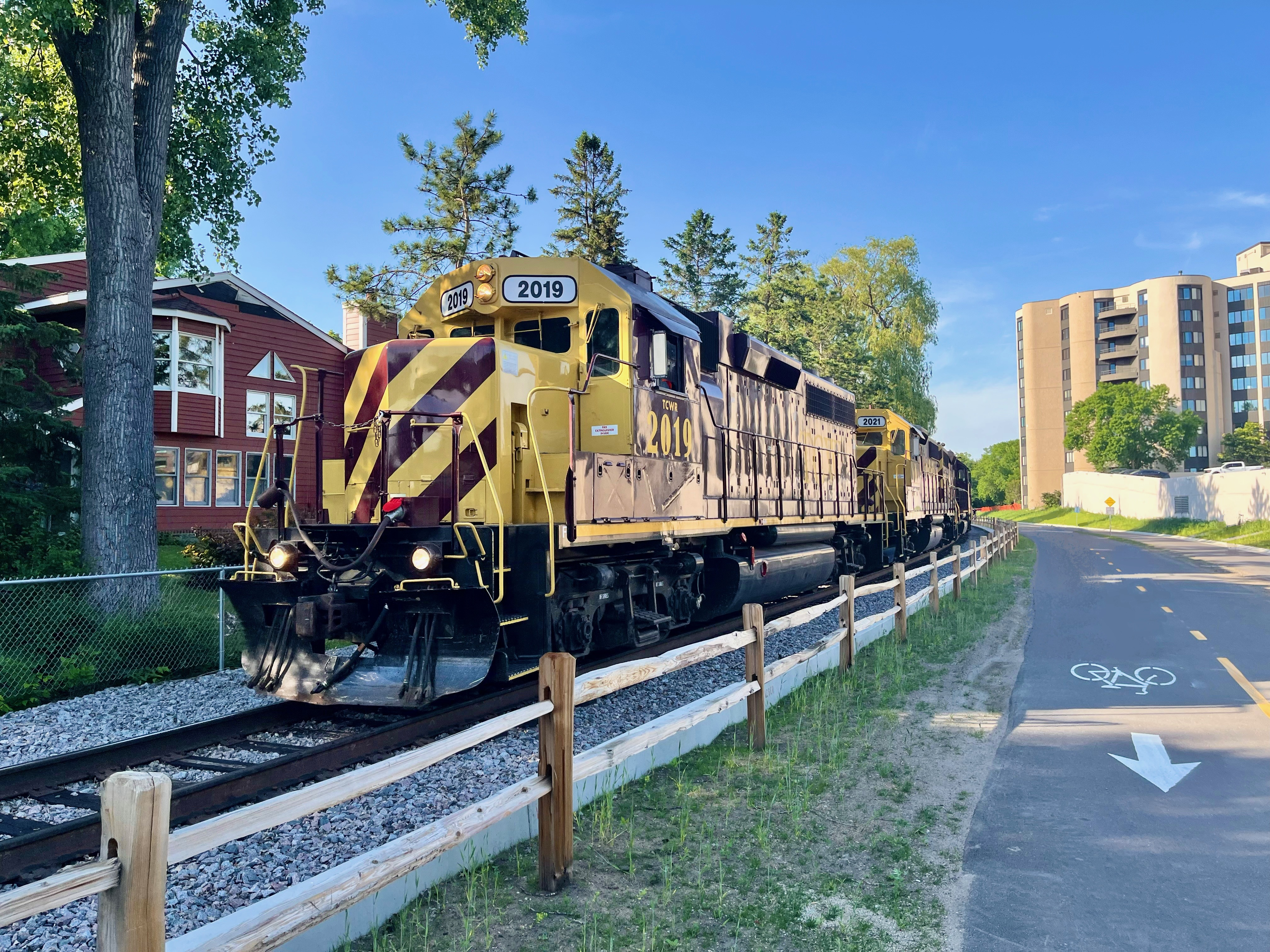
Locomotives traveling along the Kenilworth Trail.

TC&W has 9 Caterpillar Generation II locomotives (4 EMD GP20s, 3 EMD GP30s, 2 EMD GP15Cs), 2 ex-KCC EMD GP39-2s, 1 EMD CF7 slug unit, 1 Paducah rebuilt EMD GP10, 1 EMD SW1200, and 6 EMD GP38-2s. Due to the CAT units being expensive to maintain, the railroad is slowly retiring them as they break down.

Trains typically run six days per week between the Twin Cities and Renville with two- or three-day-per-week service west of Renville to Milbank, SD.

== Company officers ==
Presidents of the TC&W have included:

- Dennis Shaffer, 1991 - 1993
- William F. Drusch, 1993 - 2007.
- Mark J. Wegner, 2007–present.

Preceded by R.J. Corman Railroad/West Virginia Line	Short Line Railroad of the Year; 2008	Succeeded by Pacific Harbor Line
