= List of Edison Blue Amberol Records: Popular Series =

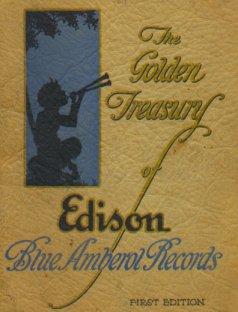
Cover of "A Golden Treasury of Edison Blue Amberol Records" catalog

Blue Amberol Records was the trademark for a type of cylinder recording manufactured by the Edison Records company in the U.S. from 1910 to 1929. Made from a nitrocellulose compound developed at the Edison laboratory—though occasionally employing Bakelite in its stead and always employing an inner layer of plaster—these cylinder records were introduced for public sale in October 1912. The first release in the main, Popular series was number 1501, and the last, 5719, issued in October 1929 just as the Edison Records concern closed up shop. The Edison company also maintained separate issue number ranges for foreign, classical and special series that are sparsely included here. The issue numbers are not necessarily continuous as some titles were not released, or otherwise skipped. Nevertheless, the Blue Amberol format was the longest-lived cylinder record series employed by the Edison Company. These were designed to be played on an Amberola, a type of Edison machine specially designed for celluloid records that did not play older wax cylinders. Blue Amberols are more commonly seen today than earlier Edison 2-minute brown or black wax and 4-minute black wax Amberol records.

The following incomplete list of Blue Amberol Records is ranked by issue number, title, writer(s), performer(s) and date. Dates are certainly not chronological for either recording or issue; the issue of certain titles could be delayed or never deployed, and some Blue Amberol releases are merely reissues of earlier records that had appeared in other formats before the Blue Amberol existed. From about July 1914, Edison's Diamond Discs were used to master Blue Amberols and releases of the same titles appear in both series, though with totally different release numbers. Some of the very last Blue Amberols were dubbed from electrical recordings, though the Amberola was never manufactured with an electrical pickup; in later years, some enthusiasts have refitted Amberola players with electrical pickups and there is evidence that even at the end of the 1920s there were kits one could order to make the conversion.

By May 1926, most Blue Amberol orders had dropped to a mere total of 800~ per record. In July 1929, this number was down to 100~.

== Edison Blue Amberols 1501–2499 ==
Issue number	Title	Writer(s)	Performer(s)	Date
1501	Overture from Semiramide	Gioachino Rossini	American Standard Orchestra	1912
1502	Trio From Faust	Charles Gounod	Agnes Kimball, Reed Miller & Frank Croxton	1912
1503	The Palms	Jean-Baptiste Faure	C. W. Harrison	1912
1504	Roses Bloom for Lovers	Bruno Granichstaedten	Grace Kerns	1912
1505	When You're Away		Helen Clark and Harvey Hindermeyer	1912
1506	Over The Waves – Waltz	José Juventino Policarpo Rosas Cadenas	New York Military Band	1912
1507	Town Topics of Pun'kin Center		Cal Stewart	1912
1508	Light As a Feather – Bell solo		Charles Daab	1912
1509	La Paloma	Sebastián Iradier	Edison Concert Band	1912
1510	My Best Girl and Me		Edward M. Favor & Chorus	1912
1511	My Uncle's Farm		Billy Golden & Joe Hughes	1912
1512	I'm Smiling at De Moon Dat Smiles At You		Gillette & Chorus	1912
1513	Just That You Are You	Johann Strauss	Walter Van Brunt	1913
1514	The Mocking Bird – Fantasia (Xylophone)		Charles Daab	1913
1515	Anchored		Knickerbocker Quartet	1912
1516	Just Before the Battle, Mother	Geo. F. Root	Will Oakland & Chorus	1912
1517	Rocked in the Cradle of the Deep	Knight	Frank Croxton	1912
1518	Whispering Hope	Alice Hawthorne	Helen Clark & Harry Anthony	1912
1519	Medley of Reels violin	D'Almaine (?)	Kitty O'Neill	1912
1520	Nita Gitana		Reed Miller	1912
1521	By the Light of the Silvery Moon	Gus Edwards	Ada Jones & Male Quartet	1912
1522	Money Musk Medley	Virginia Reel	National Promenade Band	1912
1523	"Hi" and "Si" of Jaytown		Steve Porter & Byron G. Harlan	1912
1524	Silver Bell		Ada Jones & Billy Murray	1912
1525	The Rosary	Ethelbert Nevin	Elizabeth Spencer & Knickerbocker Quartet	1912
1526	Teasing Mood (Moon)		Walter Van Brunt	1912
1527	Serenade (Title)		Florentine Instrumental Trio	1912
1528	Quartette from Rigoletto		Frank Croxton & Quartette	1912
1529	Row Row Row	William Jerome – James V. Monaco	Arthur Collins & Byron G. Harlan	1912
1530	A Little Girl At Home		Elizabeth Spencer & Harvey Hindermeyer	1912
1531	Way Down South		Heidelberg Quartet	1912
1532	Dixie Medley – Banjo Solo		Fred Van Eps	1912
1533	Tell Mother I'll Be There	Charles Fillmore	James F. Harrison & Edison Mixed Quartet	1912
1534	Oh! You Circus Day – Medley (Whi.)		Joe Belmont	1912
1535	Music Vot's Music Must Come From Berlin		Maurice Burkhart	1912
1536	Ma Lady Lou		Walter Van Brunt & Chorus	1912
1537	List! The Cherubic Host (Holy City)		Frank Croxton and Chorus of Female Voices	1912
1538	I Will Love You When the Silver Threads are Shining Among the Gold		Manuel Romain	1912
1539	Medley of Southern Plantation Songs		Edison Military Band	1912
1540	Under the Big September Moon		Albert Campbell & Irving Gillette	1912
1541	When Was There Ever a Night Like This?		Charles W. Harrison	1913
1542	My Hula Hula Love	Percy Wenrich	Metropolitan Quartette	1912
1543	Red Wing	Kerry Mills	Frederick Potter & New York Military Band	1913
1544	Darkie's Dream & Darkie's Awakening- bjo		Fred Van Eps	1913
1545	Abide with me	William Henry Monk	Frank Croxton & Quartette	1912
1546	For This		Charles W. Harrison	1912
1547	Silver Threads Among the Gold		Will Oakland	1912
1548	Good Night, Good Night Beloved		Emos Quartet	1912
1549	My Sumurun Girl- Melody- banjo	Al Jolson and Louis A. Hirsch	Fred Van Eps	1912
1550	Casey Jones		Billy Murray & Chorus	1912
1551	The Count of Luxembourg - Waltzes	Franz Lehár	American Standard Orchestra	1912
1552	Are You Going to Dance?		Elizabeth Spencer & Irving Gillette	1912
1553	Bell Solo from the Magic Flute	Wolfgang Amadeus Mozart	Charles Daab	1912
1554	Roses, Roses Everywhere		Hindermeyer	1912
1555	Where the Moonbeams Gleam (Daniels)		Campbell and Gillette	1912
1556	When I Waltz With You		Charles W. Harrison	1912
1557	Nearer My God to Thee		Knickerbocker Quartette	1912
1558	Minuet - Paderewski		America Standard Orchestra	1912
1559	The Valley of Peace		Harry Anthony & James F. Harrison *(Young & Wheeler)	1912
1560	Coon Song "The Preacher and the Bear"	Arizonia	Arthur Collins	1912
1561	The Glory Song		Harry Anthony & James F. Harrison	1912
1562	The Land of Golden Dreams		Elsie Baker & James F. Harrison	1912
1563	Aunt Dinah's Golden Wedding		Empire Vaudeville Company	1912
1564	Sounds from the Operas – Waltzes		National Promenade Band	1912
1565	I Want To Love You While The Music's Playing		Knickerbocker Quartet	1912
1566	The Village Band – March Song	Theodore Morse	Walter Van Brunt & Chorus	1912
1567	One Heart Divine		Elizabeth Spencer & Irving Gillette	1912
1568	On a Beautiful Night with a Beautiful Girl	Will D. Cobb – Gus Edwards	Walter Van Brunt	1912
1569	Nora Acushla	H. Millard	Will Oakland & Chorus	1912
1570	Serenade	Kotzschmar	The Tollefsen Trio	1912
1571	Darktown Eccentricities		Billy Golden & Joe Hughes	1912
1572	She Was Bred In Old Kentucky		Manuel Romain	1912
1573	Lustspiel Overture	Adalbert Keler	Edison Concert Band	1912
1574	Medley of War Songs		New York Military Band	1912
1575	Put On Your Old Grey Bonnet		Joseph A. Phillips & Chorus	1912
1576	Rap, Rap, Rap, Rap On Your Minstrel Bones		Edward Meeker	1912
1577	The Wedding Glide from "The Passing Show of 1912"		Ada Jones, Billy Murray, & Chorus	1912
1578	The Shepherd Boy		Venetian Instrumental Trio	1912
1579	My Song Shall Be Always Thy Mercy		Agnes Kimball & Reed Miller	1912
1580	Dear Robin I'll Be True		Will Oakland & Chorus	1912
1581	Edelweiss and Almenrausch – Instrumental		Venetian Instrumental Trio	1912
1582	Luella Lee		Albert Campbell & Irving Gillette	1912
1583	Uncle Josh Buys an Automobile		Cal Stewart	1912
1584	On a Good Old-Time Straw Ride		Byron G. Harlan	1912
1585	When I Carved Your Name On The Tree		Harvey Hindermeyer	1912
1586	Weeping, Sad and Lonely		Elizabeth Spencer & Chorus	1912
1587	Everybody Two-Step – Coon Song		Billy Murray	1912
1588	That Mellow Melody		Anna Chandler	1912
1589	That's How I Need You	Joseph McCarthy & Joe Goodwin	Henry Burr & Irving Gillette	1912
1590	My Little Lovin' Sugar Babe		Premier Quartet	1912
1591	Buddy Boy – Coon Duet	Percy Wenrich	Arthur Collins & Byron G. Harlan	1912
1592	I'm The Guy		Billy Murray	1912
1593	O Dry Those Tears!		Mary Carson	1912
1594	The Village Gossips		Cal Stewart & Byron G. Harlan	1912
1595	Mystic Dreams Waltz		Charles Daab	1912
1596	Good-Night Farewell		Knickerbocker Quartet	1912
1597	Kentucky Days		Billy Murray & Chorus	1912
1598	Wonderful Peace		R. Festyn Davies	1912
1599	Where the Edelweiss is Blooming		Elizabeth Spencer & Irving Gillette	1912
1600	Home Sweet Home the World Over		Edison Concert Band	1912
1601	The Holy City		Edwin Skedden & Edison Mixed Quartet	1912
1602	When I Get You Alone Tonight		Billy Murray & Chorus	1912
1603	Temple Bells, from "Under Many Flags"		Irving Gillette & Chorus	1912
1604	Heimweh (Longing for Home)		Venetian Instrumental Quartet	1912
1605	Hitchy Koo		Arthur Collins & Byron G. Harlan	1912
1606	Silent Night	Franz X. Gruber – Joseph Mohr	Elizabeth Spencer (soprano), Young & Wheeler	1912
1607	Sweetheart, Let's Go A-Walking		Billy Murray & Chorus	1912
1608	Luke (Recitation)		Harry E. Humphrey	1912
1609	Don't Turn My Picture to the Wall		Elizabeth Spencer & Walter Van Brunt	1912
1610	Say Love Is Not a Dream, from "The Count of Luxembourg"		Elizabeth Spencer	1912
1611	Who Puts Me in My Little Bed		Ada Jones	1912
1612	Spirit of Independence March		New York Military Band	1913
1613	At the Gate of the Palace of Dreams		Joseph A. Phillips	1913
1614	Bridal Chorus from Lohengrin	Richard Wagner	Metropolitan Quartet	1912
1615	When the Old Oaken Bucket Was New		Manuel Romain	1913
1616	Dialogue for Three, flt, oboe & cla		Julius Spindler, Santangelo & Anthony Giammatteo	1913
1617	Sleepy Rose		Arthur C. Lichty	1913
1618	Ragtime Soldier Man		Edward Meeker	1913
1619	Her Bright Smile Haunts Me Still		Charles Harrison	1913
1620	Venus Waltz		American Standard Orchestra	1913
1621	Everything's At Home Except Your Wife, from "Oh! Oh! Delphine"		Walter Van Brunt	1913
1622	Orpheus Overture	Jacques Offenbach	American Standard Orchestra	1913
1623	I'll Sit Right On the Moon		Edna Brown	1913
1624	Take Me To That Swanee Shore		Arthur Collins & Byron G Harlan	1913
1625	You're The Flower Of My Heart, Sweet Adeline		Royal Fish & Orchestra	1913
1626	Patriotic Songs of America		Premier Quartet & New York Military Band	1913
1627	When I Met You Last Night in Dreamland		Helen Clark & Edwin Skedden	1913
1628	Non-E-Ver		R. Festyn Davies	1913
1629	I'll Love You Forevermore		Harry Anthony	1913
1630	How Could I Forget Thee?		Neapolitan Instrumental Quartet	1913
1631	Sweet Antoinette		Harry Anthony and James F. Harrison	1913
1632	Fables		Bob Roberts	1913
1633	Rock of Ages (Christian hymn)		Edison Mixed Quartet	1913
1634	Kiss Me, My Honey, Kiss Me	Ted Snyder	Billy Murray & Ada Jones	1913
1635	A Day Dream		Helen Price Clark	1913
1636	Mattinata		Charles Hackett	1913
1637	On the Mississippi		Billy Murray & Chorus	1913
1638	Belle of New York & 2nd Regiment Connecticut Nat'l Guard Marches		New York Military Band	1913
1639	Waltzing Doll		Venetian Instrumental Quartet	1913
1640	Venetian Song		Alan Turner	1913
1641	St Luke 23: 33 to 38 & Calvary		Rev. William H. Morgan, D.D. and Edison Mixed Quartet	1913
1642	St. Mark 4: 35 to 41&Peace! Be Still		Rev. William H. Morgan, D. D. and Edison Mixed Quartet.	1913
1643	Yiddisha Professor	Irving Berlin	Maurice Burkhart	1913
1644	Unlucky Mose		Billy Golden & Joe Hughes	1913
1645	Down in Dear Old New Orleans	Young, Conrad, & Whidden	Premiere Quartet	1913
1646	That Syncopated Boogie-Boo		Premiere Quartet	1913
1647	Nearer, My God to Thee- Piano	Sarah Flower Adams	Ferdinand Himmelreich	1913
1648	Dixie	Daniel Decatur Emmett	N. Y. Mil. Band, w/ Fife & Drum Corps & Chorus	1913
1649	Gipsy John		Albert A Wiederhold	1913
1650	Menuett		The Tollefsen Trio	1913
1651	Lincoln's Speech at Gettysburg	A. Lincoln	Harry E. Humphrey	1913
1652	Patrick Henry's Speech	P. Henry	Harry E. Humphrey	1913
1653	Finch's Poem "The Blue and the Gray"		Harry E. Humphrey	1913
1654	Washington's Farewell Address		Harry E. Humphrey	1913
1655	Webster's Speech in reply to Hayne		Harry E. Humphrey	1913
1656	Henry Grady's Speech on "The New South"		Harry E. Humphrey	1913
1657	Dictation & Spelling, 2nd Year, 1st Half		Harry E. Humphrey	1913
1658	School Series — Dictation and spelling		Harry E. Humphrey	1913
1659	School Series — Dictation and spelling		Harry E. Humphrey	1913
1660	School Series — Dictation and spelling		Harry E. Humphrey	1913
1661	School Series — Dictation and spelling		Harry E. Humphrey	1913
1662	School Series — Dictation and spelling		Harry E. Humphrey	1913
1663	School Series — Dictation and spelling		Harry E. Humphrey	1913
1664	School Series — Dictation and spelling		Harry E. Humphrey	1913
1665	School Series — Dictation and spelling		Harry E. Humphrey	1913
1666	School Series — Dictation and spelling		Harry E. Humphrey	1913
1667	School Series — Dictation and spelling		Harry E. Humphrey	1913
1668	School Series — Dictation and spelling		Harry E. Humphrey	1913
1669	School Series — Dictation and spelling		Harry E. Humphrey	1913
1670	School Series — Dictation and spelling		Harry E. Humphrey	1913
1671	School Series — Dictation and spelling		Harry E. Humphrey	1913
1672	School Series — Dictation and spelling		Harry E. Humphrey	1913
1673	School Series — Dictation and spelling		Harry E. Humphrey	1913
1674	School Series — Dictation and spelling		Harry E. Humphrey	1913
1675	School Series — Dictation and spelling		Harry E. Humphrey	1913
1676	School Series — Dictation and spelling		Harry E. Humphrey	1913
1677	School Series — Dictation and spelling		Harry E. Humphrey	1913
1678	School Series — Dictation and spelling		Harry E. Humphrey	1913
1679	School Series — Dictation and spelling		Harry E. Humphrey	1913
1680	School Series — Dictation and spelling		Harry E. Humphrey	1913
1681	School Series — Dictation and spelling		Harry E. Humphrey	1913
1682	School Series — Dictation and spelling review exercises		Harry E. Humphrey	1913
1683	School Series — Dictation and spelling		Harry E. Humphrey	1913
1684	School Series — Dictation and spelling		Harry E. Humphrey	1913
1685	School Series — Dictation and spelling		Harry E. Humphrey	1913
1686	School Series — Dictation and spelling		Harry E. Humphrey	1913
1687	School Series — Table drill		Edward Meeker	1913
1688	School Series — Table drill		Edward Meeker	1913
1689	School Series — Problems in rapid drill work		Edward Meeker	1913
1690	School Series — Ten problems in measurements		Edward Meeker	1913
1691	School Series — Ten problems in analysis and proportion		Edward Meeker	1913
1692	School Series — Finding part of a number		Edward Meeker	1913
1693	School Series — Ten problems in fractions		Edward Meeker	1913
1694	School Series — Twelve problems in business practice		Edward Meeker	1913
1695	School Series — Practical business problems		edward Meeker	1913
1696	School Series — Practical review problems		Edward Meeker	1913
1697	School Series — Problems in percentage, group 1		Edward Meeker	1913
1698	School Series — Problems in percentage, group 2		Edward Meeker	1913
1699	School Series — Problems in percentage, group 3		Edward Meeker	1913
1700	School Series — General problems in the application of percentage		Edward Meeker	1913
1701	School Series — Ten business problems in percentage		Edward Meeker	1913
1702	School Series — General problems in percentage		Edward Meeker	1913
1703	School Series — Denominate numbers		Edward Meeker	1913
1704	School Series — Drill in denominate numbers		Edward Meeker	1913
1705	School Series — Fifteen review problems in denominate numbers		Edward Meeker	1913
1706	School Series — Miscellaneous problems, first group		Edward meeker	1913
1707	Miscellaneous (Math) Problems second group		Edward meeker	1913
1708	School Series — Miscellaneous problems, third group		Edward Meeker	1913
1709	School Series — Miscellaneous problems, fourth group		Edward Meeker	1913
1710	School Series — Miscellaneous problems, fifth group		Edward Meeker	1913
1711	Manhattan Beach & El Capitan Marches	John Philip Sousa	Sousa's Band	1913
1712	Darky School Days		Billy Golden & Joe Hughes	1913
1713	The Vacant Chair		Elizabeth Spencer & Chorus	1913
1714	Uncle Josh Keeps House		Cal Steward	1913
1715	I Will Sing of My Redeemer		Edison Mixed Quartet	1913
1716	Medley of Country Dances – Violin		Eugene Jaudas	1913
1717	Sympathy, from "The Firefly"		Charlotte Kirwan and Harvey Hindermeyer	1913
1718	Oh, What A Beautiful Dream!		Walter Van Brunt	1913
1719	When The Midnight Choo-Choo Leaves For Alabam'	Irving Berlin	Arthur Collins & Byron G. Harlan	1913
1720	The Wearing of the Green		Marie Narelle	1913
1721	O, Little Mother of Mine	Geo. Nevin	Frank Croxton & Chorus	1913
1722	Hungarian Dances (G Min & D Maj)	Brahms	The Tollefsen Trio	1913
1723	The Hymns of the Old Church Choir	A. Solman	Edison Mixed Quartet	1913
1724	Let Me Like a Soldier Fall—Maritana	(Wallace)	Charles Hackett & Chorus	1913
1725	Flanagan's Irish Jubilee	Porter	Steve Porter & Co.	1913
1726	Annie Laurie, pno	Scott–Himmelreich	Ferdinand Himmelreich	1913
1727	Deep Down in My Heart	Tom Kelley	Joseph Parsons	1913
1728	The Two Beggars	Wilson	Anthony & Harrison	1913
1729	Ride of the Thuringia Hussars	Wm. Santelmann	United States Marine Band	1913
1730	William Tell Fantasie	Rossini	Charles Daab	1913
1731	Selection from "The Doll's Eye"	Herbert	Victor Herbert & His Orchestra	1913
1732	Laughing Love	H. Christiné	New York Military Band	1913
1733	Under The Cotton Moon – Coon Song		Billy Murray & Chorus	1913
1734	Here's to Love—The Sunshine Girl	Rubens	Elizabeth Spencer	1913
1735	Georgia Land – Coon Song	Harry Carroll	Walter Van Brunt & Chorus	1913
1736	My Little Persian Rose	Anatol Friedland	Charles Harrison	1913
1737	That Old Girl of Mine	Earle C. Jones – Egbert Van Alstyne	Frederick J. Wheeler * (James F. Harrison)	1913
1738	When I Lost You	Irving Berlin	Irving Gillette	1913
1739	All Night Long	Shelton Brooks	Anna Chandler	1913
1740	Favorite Airs from the Geisha	Sidney Jones	Edison Light Opera Co.	1913
1741	I'll Get You	Gus Edwards	Walter Van Brunt	1913
1742	Beautiful Isle of Somewhere	Harry Anthony & James F. Harrison	Young & Wheeler	1913
1743	The Trail of the Lonesome Pine (song)	Ballard Macdonald, Harry Carroll	Manuel Romain	1913
1744	Tango Land—Tango (For dancing)	H. Lodge	National Promenade Band	1913
1745	My Faith Looks up to Thee	Lachner–Bassford	The Frank Croxton Quartet	1913
1746	You're Just as Sweet at Sixty as You Were at Sweet Sixteen		Will Oakland	1913
1747	The Baseball Girl		Miss Ray Cox	1913
1748	Love & Devotion		Venetian Instrumental Trio	
1749	Goodbye Boys	Andrew B. Sterling – William Jerome – Harry Von Tilzer	Billy Murray	1913
1750	Blue Danube Waltz	Johann Strauss	American Standard Orchestra	1913
1751	La Paloma	Yradier	Mary Carson	1913
1752	When That Midnight Choo-Choo Leaves for Alabam Medley	Berlin	Nat'l Promenade Band	1913
1753	Roll On, Missouri		Collins & Harlan	1913
1754	My Tango Maid	Henry Lodge	Charles W. Harrison	1913
1755	Lead Kindly Light	J. Dykes	Knickerbocker Quartet	1913
1756	La Bella Argentina—Tango	Carlos Roberto	National Promenade Band	1913
1757	Little Boy Blue	Ethelbert Nevin	Elizabeth Spencer	1913
1758	Till the Sands of the Desert Grow Cold	Ernest R. Ball	Donald Chalmers	1913
1759	Two Jolly Sailors	Israel and Porter	Porter and Harlan	1913
1760	Annie Laurie and Home Sweet Home (bells)	Dunn–Payne	John F. Burckhardt	1913
1761	Low Bridge!—Everybody Down	Thomas S. Allen	Edward Meeker	1913
1762	Always Take a Girl Named Daisy	G. W. Meyer	Albert Campbell & Irving Gillette	1913
1763	Down at Finnegan's Jamboree- Violin & Co.		Charles D’Almaine and Co.	1913
1764	Stradella Overture	Frederich von Flotow	Edison Concert Band	1913
1765	Where the Sunset Turns the Ocean's Blue to Gold		Byron G. Harlan	1913
1766	Old Comrades – March	C. Teike	United States Marine Band	1913
1767	Three Little Owls and the Naughty Little Mice &I'm Old But I'm Awfully Tough		Cal Stewart	1913
1768	Monte Cristo	Kotlar	Jorda–Rocabruna Instrumental Quintet	1913
1769	Turkey in the Straw		Golden and Hughes	1913
1770	Fisher's Hornpipe Medley – vin		Charles D’Almaine	1913
1771	Just Plain Folks		Ada Jones & Chorus	1913
1772	Somewhere	Charles K. Harris	Irving Gillette and Chorus	1913
1773	Invitation to the Waltz	Carl Maria von Weber	National Military Band	1913
1774	Italian Army March – Accordion solo		Guido Deiro	1913
1775	The Dream Melody Intermezzo (Naughty Marietta)	(Herbert)	Victor Herbert & His Orchestra	1913
1776	God Be With You Till We Meet Again	W. G. Tomer	Edison Mixed Quartet	1913
1777	Any Girl Looks Good in Summer	Phil Schwartz	Walter Van Brunt and Chorus	1913
1778	Only a Pansy Blossom		Oakland & Chorus	1913
1779	Happy Days	A. Strelezki	Elizabeth Spencer	1913
1780	Favorite Airs from "Erminie"	Jakebowski	Edison Light Opera Co.	1913
1781	My Hero from "The Chocolate Soldier		Elizabeth Spencer & Chorus	1913
1782	Garland of Old Fashioned Roses		Manuel Romain	1913
1783	Ship of My Dreams		Helen Clark & Harry Anthony	1913
1784	Welcome Home		Anna Chandler	1913
1785	Chanson Triste		Victor Herbert & His Orchestra	1913
1786	Last Night Was the End of the World		Charles W. Harrison	1913
1787	As I Sat Upon My Dear Old Mother's Knee		Will Oakland and Chorus	1913
1788	Mary and John		Walter Van Brunt	1913
1789	She Sleeps 'Neath the Old Ohio River		Harry Anthony & James F. Harrison	1913
1790	Jim Lawson's Medley of Reels		Charles D'Almaine	1913
1791	You Can't Play Every Instrument in the Orchestra		Maurice Burkhart	1913
1792	You're a Great Big Blue Eyed Baby		Premier Quartet	1913
1793	Whistling Jim		Ada Jones	1913
1794	Beautiful Beckoning Hands		Edison Mixed Quartette	1913
1795	Dream of the Tyrolienne – Instrumental		Venetian Inst Quartette	1913
1796	Snookey Ookums	Irving Berlin	Collins & Harlan	1913
1797	Famous Songs in Irish Plays		Walter Van Brunt	1913
1798	Where the River Shannon Flows		Will Oakland and Chorus	1913
1799	Sweet Dreams of Home		Charles Daab, bells	1913
1800	Oh, You Silv'ry Bells		Ada Jones & Billy Murray	1913
1801	Then You'll Remember Me		Charles Hackett	1913
1802	My Little Persian Rose – Medley Two-Step		National Promenade Band	1913
1803	Down on Uncle Jasper's Farm		Steve Porter & Byron G. Harlan	1913
1804	On Parade Medley		National Guard Fife And Drum Corps	1913
1805	Father O' Flynn		Frank Croxton	1913
1806	Ragtime Violin		Premier Quartet	1913
1807	Glowworm	Paul Lincke	Edison Concert Band	1913
1808	And the Green Grass Grew All Around		Premier Quartet	1913
1809	Jesus, Lover of My Soul		Edison Mixed Quartet	1913
1810	Invercargill March		New York Military Band	1913
1811	When the Roll is Called Up Yonder		Edison Mixed Quartet	1913
1812	Aloha Oe		Toots Paka's Hawaiians	1913
1813	I've Got the Mumps	Franklin	Irene Franklin	1913
1814	The Talkative Waitress	Franklin	Irene Franklin	1913
1815	I Want to Be a Janitor's Child	Franklin	Irene Franklin	1913
1816	I'm A-Bringing Up the Family	Franklin	Irene Franklin	1913
1817	She's My Daisy	Lauder	Harry Lauder	1913
1818	Good-Bye 'Till We Meet Again	Lauder	Harry Lauder	1913
1819	Just a Wee Deoch an Doris	Lauder	Harry Lauder	1913
1820	It's Nice When You Love a Wee Lassie	Lauder	Harry Lauder	1913
1821	I Love a Lassie	Lauder	Harry Lauder	1913
1822	A Wee Hoose 'mang the Heather	Lauder	Harry Lauder	1913
1823	Favorite Airs from Patience	Gilbert & Sullivan	New York Light Opera Company	1913
1824	It Takes a Little Rain with the Sunshine		Walter Van Brunt	1913
1825	Ciribiribin Waltz Song		Elizabeth Spencer	1913
1826	Light Cavalry Overture		Edison Concert Band	1913
1827	Sail on Silv'ry Moon		Albert H. Campbell and Irving Gillette	1913
1828	Kathleen Mavourneen		Mrs. Clarence Eddy	1913
1829	Down by the Old Mill Stream		Vernon Archibald & Marie Kaiser	1913
1830	A Woman's Smile		Charles W. Harrison	1913
1831	I Would that My Love		Elizabeth Spencer and E. Eleanor Patterson	1913
1832	I'll Change the Shadows to Sunshine	Ernest R. Ball	Irving Gillette	1913
1833	I'll Change the Shadows to Sunshine		Irving Gillette	1913
1834	When Michael Dooley Heard the Booley, Booley		Billy Murray	1913
1835	The Little Flatterer		Charles Daab	1913
1836	Gathering Home		Harry Anthony and James F. Harrison	1913
1836	Ragtime Regiment Band		Edward Meeker	1913
1837	Clamy Green		Billy Golden and Joe Hughes	1913
1838	I Love You, California		Knickerbocker Quartet and Elizabeth Spencer	1913
1839	I'd Do as Much for You		Ada Jones and Billy Murray	1913
1840	Just Plain Dog		Van Avery	1913
1841	In My Harem		Billy Murray	1913
1842	La Rumba—Tango		National Promenade Band	1913
1843	Good-Bye, Boys Medley Two-Step		National Promenade Band	1913
1844	Melinda's Wedding Day		Arthur Collins and Byron G. Harlan	1913
1845	Daddy Has a Sweetheart and Mother is Her Name		Manuel Romain	1913
1846	There's One in a Million Like You		Walter Van Brunt	1913
1847	The Whip March		New York Military Band	1913
1848	Moonlight Bay		Premier Quartet	1913
1849	Holy! Holy! Lord God Almighty!		Edison Mixed Quartet	1913
1850	Dream Faces		Elizabeth Spencer and Chorus	1913
1851	Why Did You Make Me Care?		Charles W. Harrison	1913
1852	I Laughed at the Wrong Time		Cal Stewart	1913
1853	I'm Looking for a Nice Young Fellow Who is Looking for a Nice Young Girl		Ada Jones and Chorus	1913
1854	Always Gallant Polka		Charles Daab	1913
1855	What a Friend We Have in Jesus		Edison Mixed Quartet	1913
1856	Where the Silvery Colorado Etc.		Irving Gillette & Chorus	1913
1857	Memories of Home		Venetian Instrumental Trio	1913
1858	Silver Star		Ada Jones and Billy Murray	1913
1859	Hula, Hula Medley Two-step		National Promenade Band	1913
1860	Darling Nellie Gray		Metropolitan Quartet	1913
1861	Wedding of the Winds Waltz		P. Frosini	1913
1862	God is Love, His Mercy Brightens		Agnes Kimball, Reed Miller and Frank Croxton	1913
1863	William Tell Overture		Edison Concert Band	1913
1864	Alexander's Ragtime Band Medley (Banjo)		Fred Van Eps	1913
1865	Old Black Joe		Knickerbocker Quartet	1913
1866	Uncle Josh's Huskin' Bee	Stewart	Cal Stewart and Co.	1913
1867	Teddy Bears' Picnic		American Symphony Orchestra	1913
1868	Lasca - Recitation		Edgar L. Davenport	1913
1869	When the Evening Bells are Chiming Songs of Auld Lang Syne		Manuel Romain	1913
1870	The Butterfly, flt & cla		Eugene C. Rose and George Rubel	1913
1871	The Golden Wedding		Ada Jones & Len Spencer	1913
1872	Selection from "The Red Mill"	Herbert	Victor Herbert's Orchestra	1913
1873	When You and I Were Young, Maggie		Will Oakland & Chorus	1913
1874	Gobble Duet (from The Mascot)	Edmond Audran	Elizabeth Wheeler & Harry Anthony	1913
1875	The Rube & The Country Doctor		Byron G. Harlan & Frank C. Stanley	1913
1876	Characteristic Negro Medley		Peerless Quartet	1913
1877	Romance – Tarantella	Schubert-Lucantoni	Jose' Rocabruna	1913
1878	Jolly Fellow's Waltz		Sousa's Band	1913
1879	Put On Your Slippers, You're In for the Night		Ada Jones	1913
1880	Doctor's Testimonials – Vaudeville Sketch		Golden & Hughes	1913
1881	We're Tenting To-night	Henry Clay Work	Knickerbocker Quartet	1913
1882	Put Your Arms Around Me, Honey		Ada Jones	1913
1883	Moonlight in Jungleland Medley		New York Military Band	1913
1884	Rainbow		Ada Jones & Billy Murray	1913
1885	Shepherd's Dance – Violin		Charles D' Almaine	1913
1886	Love's Old Sweet Song	J. L. Molloy	Venetian Instrumental Trio	1913
1887	The Prettiest Little Song of All- Bells		Charles Daab	1913
1888	Marching Through Georgia	Henry Clay Work	Charles Harrison & Chorus	1913
1889	Angel's Dream – Waltz		New York Military Band	1913
1890	Pinafore Airs	Gilbert & Sullivan	Edison Light Opera Company	1913
1891	Pinafore Airs No. 2	Gilbert & Sullivan	Edison Light Opera Company	1913
1892	Pinafore Airs No. 3	Gilbert & Sullivan	Edison Light Opera Company	1913
1893	Pinafore Airs No. 4	Gilbert & Sullivan	Edison Light Opera Company	1913
1894	Under Southern Skies		Manuel Romain & Chorus	1913
1895	Officer of the Day – March & The Hurricane – Two-Step		National Promenade Band	1913
1896	Uncle Josh in a Barber Shop	Stewart	Cal Stewart	1913
1897	Waiting for the Robert E. Lee		Collins & Harlan	1913
1898	Gloria from the 12th Mass (K.427)	W. A. Mozart	Edison Mixed Quartet	1913
1899	Angel's Serenade		Venetian Instrumental Trio	1913
1900	The Boom is On the Rye		Harry Anthony & James Harrison	1913
1901	The Bridge		Knickerbocker Quartet	1913
1902	Hear the Pickaninny Band	Seymour Furth	Walter Van Brunt & Chorus	1913
1903	Sauerkraut is Bully- Medley	Watson	George P. Watson	1913
1904	Extase-Reverie	Louis Ganne'	Tollefsen Trio	1913
1905	Pussy's in the Well	George Nevin	Manhattan Ladies Quartet	1913
1906	Rum Tum Tiddle	Jean Schwartz	Billy Murray	1913
1907	An Easy Job On the Farm	Golden	Billy Golden & Joe Hughes	1913
1908	Old Folks at Home- pno	Foster-Meecham	Andre Benotist	1913
1909	Seated Around an Oil Stove	Hill	Murray K. Hill	1913
1910	Good-Bye, Rose	Herbert Ingraham	Walter van Brunt	1913
1911	Say Au Revoir, but Not Good-Bye	Harry Kennedy	Will Oakland & Chorus	1913
1912	The Show Troupe at Punkin Center	Steward	Cal Stewart	1913
1913	I love to tell the Story	W. G. Fischer	Edison Mixed Quartet	1913
1914	Moonlight Dance	Herrmann Finck	American Standard Orchestra	1913
1915	Waialae (Waltz Song)	Prince Leleohoku	Toots Paka's Hawaiians	1913
1916	Pulupe (Waltz Song)	Prince Leleohoku	Toots Paka's Hawaiians	1913
1917	Tomi! Tomi!- Hawaiian Hula	Solomon Hailama	Toots Paka's Hawaiians	1913
1918	Lalani Hula's Hawaii		Toots Paka's Hawaiians	
1919	Raymond Overture	A. Thomas	Edison Concert Band	1913
1920	Call Me Back		Charles W. Harrison	1913
1921	Where the Red Red Roses Grow	Jean Schwartz	Helen Price Clark & Walter Van Brunt	1913
1922	Trocha-Tango		National Promenade Band	1913
1923	Emmett's Lullaby		Will Oakland	1913
1924	Crossing the Bar		Edison Mixed Quartet	1913
1925	Too Much Mustard	Cecil Macklin	National Promenade Band	1913
1926	Serenade	Moritz Moszkowski	Venetian Instrumental Trio	1913
1927	The Beautiful Dawn of Love	Neil Moret	Arthur C. Cough	1913
1928	That Tinkling Tango Tune	Albert Gumble	Billy Murray	1913
1929	Funny Doings At Sleepy Hollow		Harlan E. Knight & Co.	1913
1930	Way Back Home		Peerless Quartet	1913
1931	You Made Me Love You	Joseph McCarthy – James V. Monaco	Anna Chandler	1913
1932	When I Want a Little Loving		Albert H. Campbell & Irving Gillette	1913
1933	Come Where My Love Lies Dreaming		Knickerbocker Quartet	1913
1934	Down On The Farm In Harvest Time	Harlan	Byron G. Harlan	1913
1935	Sleepy Chile		Elsie Baker	1913
1936	Lead Us, Heavenly Father, Lead Us	James Edmeston	Edison Mixed Quartet	1913
1937	O You Silv'ry Bells! - Medley Two-Step		National Promenade Band	1913
1938	We've Got a Parrot in Our House		Arthur Collins & Byron G. Harlan	1913
1939	The trail of the Lonesome Pine		National Promenade Band	1913
1940	Draw Me Nearer		Harry Anthony & James F. Harrison	1913
1941	Somebody's Coming to My House	Irving Berlin	Walter Van Brunt	1913
1942	Come and kiss Your Little Baby	Lew Brown & Albert Von Tilzer	Ada Jones & Billy Murray	1913
1943	There's a Girl in the Heart of Maryland	Ballard Macdonald – Harry Carroll	Walter Van Brunt	1913
1944	Down On The Mississippi		Premier Quartet	1913
1945	Just Some One		Manuel Romain	
1946	The Sweetest Story Ever Told		Venetian Instrumental Trio	1913
1947	Only to See Her face Again		Will Oakland & Chorus	1913
1948	Bear's Oil		Billy Golden & Joe Hughes	1913
1949	Come Josephine in My Flying Machine		Ada Jones & Billy Murray with Chorus	1913
1950	Selections from "The Singing Girl"		Victor Herbert's Orc	
1951	Kathleen Mavoureen	J. N. Crouch	Knickerbocker Quartet	1913
1951	Entered Apprentice Degree Hymn		Male Quartet	
1952	Fellowcraft degree hymn (His love inspires our being)	masonic hymn	Male quartet Acc: Organ	1913
1953	Master Mason Degree Dirge		Male Quartet	1913
1954	Master Mason Degree		Male Quartet	1913
1955	My Sweetheart (Tesoro mio) – accordion solo	Ernesto Bubucci	Guido Deiro	1913
1956	When The Bell In The Lighthouse Rings		Gus Reed	1913
1957	Sheridan's Ride		Edgar L. Davenport	1913
1958	Killarney, My Home O'er The Sea		Frank X. Doyle & Chorus	
1959	Waiting Down By the Mississippi Shore		Albert H. Campbell & Irving Gillette	1913
1960	Boston Commandery March	Thos. Carter	Edison Concert Band	1913
1961	The Lighthouse By the Sea		Knickerbocker Quartet	1913
1962	Bride of the Waves – Cornet solo		Herbert L. Clarke w/ Orchestra accomp.	1913
1963	Rockin' in de win'	Neidlinger	Bessie Volckmann	1913
1964	Sailor's Hornpipe Medley		Charles D'Almaine	1913
1965	Grand Baby Or Baby Grand		Ada Jones	1913
1966	The Kiss		H. Bennie Henton	1913
1967	A Day in Venice (Suite)		American Standard Orchestra	1913
1968	A Day in Venice (Suite) No.2		American Standard Orchestra	1913
1969	Grandma's Mustard Plaster	Hill	Murray K. Hill	1913
1970	Masaniello Overture	Auber	Edison Concert Band	1913
1971	Peaches and Cream		Ada Jones & Len Spencer	1913
1972	Dancing On the House Top	Edwin Christie	Charles Daab	1913
1973	Do They Think of Me At Home?		Manhattan Mixed Trio	1913
1974	Bonnie Doon		Marie Narelle	1913
1975	March Religioso		Edison Concert Band	1913
1976	Be Happy	R. Wagar	Edison Mixed Quartet	1913
1977	Ah! Moon of My Delight		Reed Miller	1913
1978	I Want to Be Home Down in Dixie		Arthur Collins & Byron G. Harlan	1913
1979	Birds of the Forest		Guido Gialdini	1913
1980	Infanta March, bjo		Fred Van Eps	1913
1981	I. O. O. F. Opening & Closing Odes, two separate tracks		Male Quartet	1913
1982	I. O. O. F. Initiation & Installation Odes		Male Quartet	1913
1983	I. O. O. F.		Male Quartet	1913
1984	Are You Coming Home Tonight?		Harry Anthony & James Harrison	1913
1985	So-So Polka		Charles Daab	1913
1986	Uncle Josh's Rheumatism	Stewart	Cal Stewart	1913
1987	It's Got to Be Someone I Love		Ada Jones	1913
1988	Jere Sanford's Yodeling and Whistling Specialty	Sanford	Jere Sanford	1913
1989	II Trovatore - Anvil Chorus	Giuseppe Verdi	Edison Light Opera Company	1913
1990	Gerimeo Polka		US Marine Band	1913
1991	Praise Ye (Attila)	Giuseppe Verdi	Agnes Kimball, Reed Miller & Frank Croxton	1913
1992	Beautiful Lady		Elizabeth Spencer	1913
1993	Long, Long Ago, flute		Julius Spindler	1913
1994	Never the Maiden Dreamed		Charles Harrison	1913
1995	At the Mill – March		Bohumir Kryl & His Band	1913
1996	The Harp That Once Thro' Tara's Halls		Irving Gillette & Chorus	1913
1997	You'll Do the Same Thing All Over Again		Billy Murray	1913
1998	Silver Bell		American Standard Orchestra	1913
1999	The Old Time Street Fakir		Steve Porter & Byron G. Harlan	1913
2000	Chimes of Normandy Airs		Edison Light Opera Company	1913
2001	Rastus, Take Me Back!		Marie Dressler	1913
2002	A Woodland Serenade		Edison Concert Band	1913
2003	I Hope I Don't Intrude (Bells)		Charles S. Daab	1913
2004	Crucifix		Reed Miller & Frank Croxton	1913
2005	The Skater's Waltz	Emile Waldteufel	N.Y. Military Band	1913
2006	Comic Epitaphs		Billy Golden & Joe Hughes	1913
2007	When Old Folks Were Young Folks		Manuel Romain & Chorus	1913
2008	Madame Butterfly – Selection	G. Puccini	Victor Sorlin	1913
2009	The Revival Meeting at Pumpkin Center	Stewart	Cal Stewart & Co.	1913
2010	Souvenir – Mandolin	Drdla	Demetrius C. Dounis	1913
2011	All Aboard for Blanket Bay		Harry Anthony & James Harrison	1913
2012	In the Golden Afterwhile	Luther A. Clark	Peerless Quartet	1913
2013	Good Night – Waltz		New York Military Band	1913
2014	Der Tambour der Garde Overture	A. E. Titl	Edison Concert Band	1913
2015	Villanelle		Marie Kaiser	1913
2016	They've Got Me Doin' It Now		Billy Murray	1913
2017	When It's Apple Blossom Time in Normandy		Irving Gillette	1913
2018	A Little Bunch of Shamrocks		Frank X. Doyle	1913
2019	Here Comes My Daddy Now – Medley		National Promenade Band	1913
2020	You're the Same Old Girl		Walter Van Brunt	1913
2021	Snow Deer		Ada Jones & Billy Murray	1913
2022	Curse of an Aching Heart	Henry Fink – Al Piantadosi	Will Oakland	
2023	Sunshine and Roses		Irving Gillette & Elizabeth Spencer	1913
2024	Chant Sans Paroles (Souvenir de Haspal)		The Tollofsen Trio	1913
2025	Is My Name Written There?	Harry Anthony & James Harrison	Young & Wheeler	1913
2026	That Tango Tokio		Billy Murray	1913
2027	Salvation Nell		Peerless Quartet	1913
2028	Let Us See Your Rainbow Smile		Albert Campbell & Irving Gillette	1913
2029	National Emblem March		New York Military Band	1913
2030	There's a Mother Always Waiting You at Home, Sweet Home		Will Oakland & Chorus	1913
2031	Goodbye Summer! So Long Fall! Hello Wintertime!		Premiere Quartet	1913
2032	Mammy Jinny's Jubilee		Arthur Collins & Byron G. Harlan	1913
2033	You're My Girl		Walter Van Brunt	1913
2034	Gold and Silver – Waltz	J. Strauss	National Promenade Band	1913
2035	Where Did You Get That Girl?		Billy Murray	1913
2036	Peg O' My Heart	Alfred Bryan – Fred Fisher	Walter Van Brunt	1913
2037	Alderman Doolin's Campaign Speech	Porter	Steve Porter	1913
2038	Marche Lorraine		New York Military Band	1913
2039	Sailing Down the Chesapeake Bay		Premiere Quartet	1913
2040	Come Back, I'm Pining Away		Anna Chandler	1913
2041	When Old Silas Does the Turkey Trot to the Turkey in the Straw		Arthur Collins & Byron G. Harlan	1913
2042	Face to Face		Helen Price Clark	1913
2043	The Pullman Porters On Parade		Edward Meeker	1913
2044	S. R. Henry's Barn Dance		New York Military Band	1913
2045	The Shipmates		Billy Golden & Joe Hughes	1913
2046	The Old Oaken Bucket		Knickerbocker Quartet	1913
2047	Every Little Movement		American Standard Orchestra	1913
2048	Alexander's Ragtime Band		Billy Murray	1913
2049	Trust In the Lord		Nevada Van der Veer & Reed Miller	1913
2050	The Passing Caravan – Patrol		New York Military Band	1913
2051	Favorite Airs from the Arcadians		Edison Light Opera Company	1913
2052	Irish and Scotch Melodies		Charles Daab	1913
2053	I Long to See the Girl I Left Behind		Manuel Romain	1913
2054	Praise Ye – Attila	Giuseppe Verdi	Bohumir Kryl and his Band	1913
2055	Asthore		Reinhald Werrenrath	1913
2056	Garry Owen		Eugene A. Jaudas	1913
2057	One Fine Day	Giacomo Puccini	Agnes Kimball	1913
2058	Dream Pictures		American Standard Orchestra	1913
2059	Mrs. Clancy's Boarding House		Empire Vaudeville Company	1913
2060	Waltz Caprice, mandolin & gtr		Samuel Siegel & Ray Butin	1913
2061	Sweet Longing		Venetian Instrumental Trio	1913
2062	Calm as the Night		Elizabeth Spencer & James Harrison	1913
2063	Virginia Reel		National Promenade Band	1913
2064	Hail! Hail! Day of Days		Edison Mixed Quartet	1913
2065	Thy Sentinel I Am		T. Foster Why	1913
2066	Come On Over Here		Elizabeth Spencer & Billy Murray	1913
2067	That Tango Tokio Medley		National Promenade Band	1913
2068	When Dreams Come True		Thomas Chalmers	1913
2069	I Wish That You belonged to Me		Ada Jones & Murray	1913
2070	Adele - Adele	Jean Briquet & Adolf Philipp	Elizabeth Spencer	1913
2071	Ragtime in the Air		Billy Murray & Chorus	1913
2072	Liebesleid		Hans Kronold	1913
2073	In the Shadow of the Pines		Vernon Archibald & Royal Fish	1913
2074	Hotel Porter and the Traveling Salesman		Billy Golden & Joe Hughes	1913
2075	Dear Old Girl		Will Oakland	1913
2076	The Horse Trot		National Promenade Band	1913
2077	If We Were On Our Honeymoon (From "The Doll Girl")	Jerome Kern	Elsie Baker & Royal Fish	1913
2078	The International Rag	Irving Berlin	Billy Murray	1913
2079	Those Ragtime Melodies	Gene Hodgkins	Peerless Quartet	1913
2080	Maria Padilla	Gaetano Donizetti	Julius Spindler & Anthony Giammatteo	1913
2081	We Have Much to be Thankful For	Irving Berlin	Manuel Romain	1913
2082	'Cross the Mason–Dixon line	Henry I. Marshall	Premier Quartet	1913
2083	Garewell Marguerite	Boardman	Charles W. Harrison	1913
2084	Aisha – Indian, Intermezzo (From Weber & Fields' "All Aboard	John Lindsey	Edison Concert Band	1913
2085	Lieber Augustin (from the comic opera "Lieber Augustin")	Leo Fall	Elizabeth Spencer	1913
2086	Look In Her Eyes (from the comic opera "Lieber Augustin")	Jerome Kern	Vernon Archibald	1913
2087	Ever Since You Told Me That You Love Me (I'm A Nut)	Jean Schwartz	Billy Murray	1913
2088	The Girl in the Gingham Gown (from the NY Hippodrome revue "America")		Harvey Hindermeyer	1913
2089	Hungarian Rag	Julius Lenzberg	New York Military Band	1913
2090	Bells of Christmas	I. H. Meredith	Edison Concert Band & Chorus	1913
2091	Ring Out the Bells of Christmas	W. C. Williams	Edison Concert Band & Edison Mixed Quartet	1913
2092	Old Jim's Christmas Hymn	William B. Grey	John Young & Fredrick Wheeler	1913
2093	The Musical Wizard and the Bell Boy	Spencer	Len Spencer & Albert Campbell	1913
2094	Song Bird – Intermezzo	Harry L. Alford	Charles Daab	1913
2095	'Lizabeth Ann	Theodore F. Morse	Albert Campbell & Irving Gillette	1913
2096	Valse Boston	Dirgo-Lumbye	National Promenade Band	1913
2097	Cradle Song		Elsie Baker	
2098	Cradle Song	Kate Vannah	Elsie Baker	1913
2099	Every Little Movement	Karl Hoschna	Marie Narelle, Albert Porter & Chorus	1913
2100	Selections from Rigoletto	Giuseppe Verdi	Edison Concert Band	1913
2101	The Two Poets (Vaudeville Sketch)		Billy Golden & Joe Hughes	1913
2102	Romance from L'Eclair	Jacques Hallevy	Venetian Instrumental Trio	1913
2103	I'll Take You Home Again, Kathleen	T. Westerdorf	Will Oakland & Chorus	1913
2104	Stars and Stripes Forever March	John Philip Sousa	Sousa's Band	1913
2105	The Bird on Nellie's Hat	Alfred Sollman	Ada Jones	1913
2106	The Last Chord	Sir Arthur Sullivan	Reed Miller	1913
2107	Amoreuse Waltz	Rudolph Berger	Paul Frosini	1913
2108	Uncle Josh in a Photograph Gallery	Stewart	Cal Stewart	1913
2109	The Broken Melody	August Von Biene	American Standard Orchestra	1913
2110	Gypsy Love Song (The Fortune Teller)	Victor Herbert	Frank Croxton & Mixed chorus	1913
2111	The Premiere Polka	Edward Llewellyn	Arthur S. Whitcomb accomp by US Marine Band	1913
2112	A String of Laughs	Hill	Murray K. Hill	1913
2113	The Owl in the Old Oak Tree	Benj. Hapgood Burt	"That Girl" Quartet	1913
2114	Southern Dream Patrol	Franz Mahl	New York Military Band	1913
2115	The Beautiful Galatea Overture	Franz von Suppé	Edison Concert Band	1914
2116	Sunlight – Waltz Song	Harriet Ware	Marie Kaiser	1914
2117	The Lord Is My Shepherd	Smart	Charlotte Kirwan & Kathryn Hall Staats	1914
2118	Take Me Back	Irving Berlin	Walter van Brunt	1914
2119	A Dream	J. C. Bartlett	Ernest Albert Couturier	1914
2120	When the Song Birds Sing No More		Emory B Randolph	1914
2121	When I Dream of old Erin	Friedman	Irving Gillette & Chorus	1914
2122	If You Only Knew What I Know, Says the Moon	Sharp	Ada Jones	1914
2123	Marriage Bells, xyl & bells	O' Reardon	John F. Burkhardt & Charles Daab	1914
2124	Frisco Dan	Van Allstyne	Billy Murray	1914
2125	Where Is My Wandering Boy Tonight	Robert Lowery	Edison Mixed Quartet	1914
2126	My Mother's Old Red Shawl	Moreland	Will Oakland	1914
2127	Old Black Joe – With variations- piano	Foster-Benotist	Andre Benotist	1914
2128	The Maple Leaf Forever	Muir	Knickerbocker Quartet & New York Military Band	1914
2129	On the Old Front Porch	A. Lange	Ada Jones & Billy Murray	1914
2130	On the Honeymoon Express	Kendis & Stilwell	Arthur Collins & Byron G. Harlan	1914
2131	When I Lost You	Irving Berlin	Charles D'Almaine	1913
2132	Favorite Airs from Rob Roy	Reginald de Koven	Edison Light Opera Company	1914
2133	Floating Down the River	White	Premier Quartet	1913
2134	An Irish Husband (From "The Marriage Market "	Jerome Kern	Irving Gillette & Chorus	1914
2135	Miss Mexico – Tango	Henry Frantzen	National Promenade Band	1914
2136	Tra, La, La, La!	Irving Berlin	Billy Murray	1914
2137	What D'ye Mean You Lost Yer Dog?	Daly	Edward Meeker	1914
2138	When the Corn Is Waving	Blamplain-Buck	Knickerbocker Quartet	1914
2139	The International Rag Medley – Turkey Trot	Irving Berlin	National Promenade Band	1914
2140	Be My Little Baby Bumble Bee (from "A Winsome Widow)	Henry Marshall	Elizabeth Spencer & Walter Van Brunt	1914
2141	Down In Monkeyville		Arthur Collins & Byron G. Harlan	1914
2142	The Lass from The County Mayo	Raymond A. Browne	Owen J. McCormack	1914
2143	In the Land of Plankity Plank	Theodore J. Morse	Premiere Quartet	1914
2144	From Maine to Oregon – March	Sousa	New York Military Band	1914
2145	Aida – March	G. Verdi	Edison Concert Band	1914
2146	The Kerry Dance	James J. Molloy	Elizabeth Spencer	1914
2147	On the Banks of the Wabash Far Away	Paul Dresser	Vernon Archibald & Chorus	1914
2148	Kiss Me Goodnight	Goodwin & Brown	Billy Murray	1914
2149	The Nightingale	Ed Mollenhauer	Henry Heidelberg	1914
2150	When the Twilight Comes to Kiss the Rose Good-night	Henry W. Petrie	George Wilton Ballard	1914
2151	Sweet Anna Marie	Theodore Morse	Albert Campbell & Irving Gillette	1914
2152	A Little Christmas Basket & Howdy! Howdy! Howdy!	Paul Lawrence Dunbar	Edward Sterling Wright	1914
2153	When De C'on Pone's Hot & 'Possum	Paul Lawrence Dunbar	Edward Sterling Wright	1914
2154	Our Volunteers – Waltz	Santelmann	United States Marine Band	1914
2155	Would You take Me Back Again?	A. Solman	Manuel Romain	1914
2156	There's Lots Of Stations On My Railroad Track	Leo Edwards	Ada Jones & Billy Murray	1914
2157	Ruy Blas Overture	Mendelssohn	Victor Herbert & His Orchestra	1914
2158	Samson et Dalila – My Heart at Thy Sweet Voice	Saint-Saens	Mary Jordan	1914
2159	Underneath the Tango Moon	Harry Carroll	Arthur Collins & Byron G. Harlan	1914
2160	Flee As A Bird	Mrs. S. M. A. Dana	Helen Price Clark	1914
2161	Tango – La Bella Cubanera		National Promenade Band	1914
2162	How Long Have You Been Married?	Rennie Carmack	Billy Murray	1914
2163	Ever Of Thee	Farley Hall	Venetian Instrumental Qrt.	1914
2164	Just Because It's You (from "The Little Cafee")	Ivan Caryl	Elizabeth Spencer	1914
2165	Tres Chic – One Step	Dan Caslar	National Promenade Band	1914
2166	The "Honest" Hold-Up Man and Billy Beans	Hill	Murray K. Hill	1914
2167	Dinah	Henry I. Marshall	Peerless Quartet	1914
2168	When It's Springtime In Virginia	Erdman	Owen J. McCormack	1914
2169	Under the Double Eagle March	J. F. Wagner	New York Military Band	1914
2170	Saw Ye My Savior? - Communion Hymn	Mary Baker Eddy	Edison Mixed Quartet	1914
2171	Dance of the Hours	Ponchinelli	New York Military Band	1914
2172	'Tis But A Faded Flower	Ambroise Thomas	John Young & Frederick Wheeler	1914
2173	Lead Me to That Beautiful Land	Goertz & Berlin	Stella Mayhew	1914
2174	King Karl March	C. Unruh	New York Military Band	1914
2175	The Bonnie Blue Flag		Polk Miller & His Old South Quartet	1914
2176	Laughing Song		Polk Miller & His Old South Quartet	1914
2177	What A Time		Polk Miller & His Old South Quartet	1914
2178	The Watermelon Party		Polk Miller & His Old South Quartet	1914
2179	Favorite Airs from Mikado	Gilbert & Sullivan	New York Light Opera Company	1914
2180	Punchinello	J. L. Molloy	Edmund A. Jahn	
2181	Love Is A Story That's Old		Mary Carson & Chorus	1914
2182	You've Got Your Mother's Big Blue Eyes		Walter Van Brunt	
2183	Stabat Mater – Inflammatus, cnt		Gustav Heim	
2184	Your Tiny Hand is Frozen	Puccini	Charles Harrison	1914
2185	Beautiful Bird, Sing On		Marie Kaiser	1914
2186	The Old Clarinet		Empire Vaudeville Co.	
2187	Dream Days		Manual Romain	1914
2188	You Need A Rag		Premier Qrt	
2189	Jesus, I Come		Young & Wheeler	
2190	That's How I Lost Him		Ada Jones	
2191	Fein Und Chic Gavotte		United States Marine Band	
2192	Aunt Mandy		Golden and Hughes	1914
2193	The battle eve	(Bonheur-Southey)	Royal Fish & Vernon Archibald	1914
2194	He'd Have To Get Under, Get Out and Get Under	Clarke-Leslie-Abrahams; "The Pleasure Seekers	Billy Murray	1914
2195	Bonnie Scotland Medley (Xylophone)		Charles Daab	
2196	There's A Girl In Arizona		George Wilton Ballard	1914
2197	The Pussy Cat Rag	Allen-Daly	Ada Jones & the Peerless Quartet	1914
2198	G. A.R. Patrol		New York Military Band	1914
2199	G.A.R. Patrol		New York Military Band	1914
2200	Who Will Be With You When I Go Away		Collins & Harlan	1914
2201	Dixie Days		Owen McCormack & Chorus	1914
2202	By The Old Wishing Well		Campbell & Gillette	
2203	Columbian Exposition March		New York Military Band	
2204	Dreams of Galilee		Edison Mixed Quartet	
2205	Peg O'My Heart – Medley Turkey Trot		National Promenade Band	
2206	Dreaming – Waltz Hesitation		National Prominade Band	
2207	Ma Poulette - One Step		National Prominade Band	
2208	When It's Apple Blossom Time In Normandy		National Promenade Band	
2209	Dream Tango		National Promenade Band	
2210	Hallelujah, Christ is Risen!		Edison Mixed Quartet	1914
2211	The Bubble, from "High Jinks"		Emory B Randolph & Chorus	
2212	All Aboard For Dixie Land		Ada Jones & Chorus	
2213	The Rosary		Albert Couturier	1914
2214	A Little Love, A Little Kiss		Reed Miller	
2215	Favorite Airs from Pirates of Penzance	Gilbert & Sullivan	Edison Light Opera Company	1914
2216	Sit Down, You're Rocking the Boat		Billy Murray	1914
2217	Cavallara Rusticana – Siciliana and Intermezzo		American Standard Orc.	1914
2218	My Chain Of Memories		Beulah Young	
2219	Rev 21:21-25 & The Gates Ajar For Me	S.J. Vail	Rev Madison C. Peters, DD & Edison Mixed Quartet	unknown
2220	My Love Nell		F. G. MacLean	1914
2221	Hungarian fantasia	Tobani	Edison Concert Band	1914
2222	Sing Me The Rosary	Klickmann-Lewis	Gillette and mixed chorus	1914
2223	Lullaby	Butterworth-Chapman	Grace Couch Embler	1914
2224	I'm Crying Just For You	McCarthy-Monaco	Jones & Murray	1914
2225	The Junk Man Rag Medley		Fred Van Eps, banjo	
2226	Love divine, all love excelling	Stainer	Marie Kaiser & Royal Fish	1914
2227	Toreador Song		Alan Turner	
2228	Love is so fickle — Waltz hesitation	Kruseman	National Promenade Band	1914
2229	The Bells		Peerless Qrt.	1914
2230	I'm Crazy 'Bout A Ragtime Minstrel Band		Edward Meeker	1914
2231	The Stanley Tango		National Prominade Band	1914
2232	The Ragtime Dream		Collins & Harlan	1914
2233	I'm On My Way To Mandalay		Campbell & Gillette	1914
2234	You're My Girl-Medley		National Prominade Band	1914
2235	In de mornin	Dunbar	Edward Sterling Wright	19194
2236	The Dear Old Songs		Will Oakland	1914
2237	Pastel-Menuel		Tollefsen Trio	
2238	When The Bloom Is On The Cotton, Dixie Lee		Manuel Rowan	1914
2239	My Old Kentucky Home		Edison Concert Band	
2240	Ace of diamonds — Danish folk dance	Traditional	National Promenade Band	1914
2241	Bleking — Swedish folk dance	Traditional	National Promenade Band	1914
2242	The Carrousel-Swedish Folk Song	Traditional	National Promenade Band	
2243	Danish Dance of Greeting	Traditional	National Promenade Band	1914
2244	Highland fling — Scottish folk dance	Traditional	National Promenade Band	1914
2245	Highland schottische — Scottish folk dance	Traditional	National Promenade Band	1914
2246	The Irish Jig – Irish Folk Song	Traditional	National Promenade Band	1914
2247	I see you — Swedish folk dance	Crompton	National Promenade Band	1914
2248	Lassie's Dance – Swedish Folk Dance	Traditional	National Promenade Band	
2249	Shoemaker's dance	traditional	National Promenade Band	1914
2250	Clap Dance – Swedish Folk Dance		National Promenade Band	
2251	Trallen — Swedish folk dance	traditional	National Promenade Band	1914
2252	Favorite Airs from "The Mascot"		Edison Light Opera	
2253	You're Here And I'm Here, from "The Laughing Husband"		Kathleen Kingston & Billy Murray	1914
2254	In The Candle-Light		Helen Clark & Emory B Randolph	
2255	Fest Overture	leutner	Edison Concert Band	1914
2256	When You're All Dresses Up And No Place To Go		Billy Murray	
2257	Ring on, sweet bells	nevin	Royal Fish & Vernon Archibald	1914
2258	I Miss You Most of All	Joseph McCarthy Sr. & James V. Monaco	Manuel Romain	
2259	Coquetterie		Edison Concert Band	
2260	Won't You Come And Waltz With Me		Mary Carson & Hindermeyer	1914
2261	Song of The Mill		Elizabeth Spencer & Chorus	
2262	In dreams, my own	Sigourney-Vanderpool	james walbank	1914
2263	Peg O' My Heart – violin solo	Alfred Bryan & Fred Fisher	Charles D'Almaine	1914
2264	Love's Own Sweet Song	C.C.S. Cushing – E.P. Heath – Emmerich Kalman	Elizabeth Spencer (soprano) & Irving Gillette	
2265	Softly and Tenderly		Edison Mixed Quartette	1914
2266	My hidden treasure	Kalmar	Walter van Brunt	1914
2267	Nights of Gladness – Waltz Boston		National Promenade Band	1914
2268	Camp Meeting Band		Collins & Harlan	1914
2269	A Song Of Steel		D. Chalmers	1914
2270	Rebecca of Sunny-rook Farm	A. Seymour Brown – Albert Gumble	Al Campbell & Irving Gillette	1913
2271	There's A Girl In The Heart Of Maryland		National Promenade Band	
2272	An Afternoon in June		Murray & Belmont	1914
2273	Let me dream again	stephenson-sullivan	Merle Alcock	1914
2274	Hiram Tucker		Ada Jones & Byron G. Harlan	1914
2275	Don't Stop Please		Peerless Quartette	1914
2276	All For The Girlies		National Prominade Band	
2277	I'm Getting Ready For My Mother-in-law		Edward Meeker	1914
2278	Moonlight on the Lake		Knickerbocker Quartet	
2279	Moving Day At Pumpkin Center		Cal Stewart	1914
2280	Si Perkin's Barn Dance		Jones & Spencer	1914
2281	The gift	Behrend-Weatherly	Harold Jarvis	1914
2282	Songs of Scotland		Edison Concert Band	1914
2283	Songs of Scotland- Part 2		Edison Concert Band	1914
2284	Scots Wha Hae Wi' Wallace Blood	Harold Jarvis	burns	1914
2285	Cantique De Noel		Albert Quesnel	
2286	Hosanna	Granier-Didie	Albert Quesnel	1914
2287	Oh, Canada	Lavallée-Routhier	Henry Burr	1914
2288				
2289	Jessie, The Flower O'Dunblane		Marie Narelle	
2290				
2291	Dengozo MaxinE – Dengozo – Tango Brazilian		National Promenade Band	
2292				
2293	Isle D'Amour – Waltz Hesitation		National Promenade Band	
2294	Leg Of Mutton – One-Step		National Prominade Band	
2295	Queen Of The Movie - Melody		National Prominade Band	1914
2296	Rye Waltzes		National Promenade Band	1914
2297	Some Smoke – One Step		National Promenade Band	
2298	Poem		National Prominade Band	
2299	Favorites Airs from The Prince of Pilsen		Edison Light Opera Co	
2300	In the Valley of the Moon		Spencer & Archibald	1914
2301	Flower Song		Venetian Inst Qrt	
2302	When The Maple Leaves Were Falling		Clark & Randolph	
2303	Why Is The Ocean So Near The Shore		Ada Jones	1914
2304	In The Town Where I Was Born		Mark McCormack	
2305	While The Rivers Of Love Flow On		Charles Harrison	
2306	St. John 14 1-3 & A Home On High		Rev. M.C. Peters and The Edison Quartet	1914
2307				
2308	Going Back To Arkansas		Golden & Hughes	1914
2309	Lord, I'm Coming Home		Harry Anthony & James F. Harrison (as "Young & Wheeler")	
2310	She's Dancing Her Heart Away		Manual Romain	
2311	Where Can I Meet You Tonight		Jones & Murray	1914
2312	I Love You Just Like Lincoln Loved The Old Red, White And Blue		Peerless Qrt.	
2313	At The Mermaid's Fancy Ball		Billy Murray	
2314	Celebratin' Day in Tennessee		Collins & Harlan	
2315	In The Valley Where The Blue Birds Sing		Emory B. Randolph	
2316				
2317	Elk's Opening & Closing Odes		Knickerbocker Quartet	
2318				
2319				
2320	B.P.O.E. Elk's Song		Nat. M. Wills	
2321	Elk's Minstrels		Elk's Minstrel Co.	
2322				
2323				
2324				
2325	Fourth Of July Patrol		New York Military Band With Chorus	
2326	Fourth Of July At Punkin Center		Cal Stewart	1914
2327	Favorite Airs from "Emani"		Edison Light Opera Co.	
2328	I Love The Ladies		Irving Kaufman	
2329	Gippsland March		New York Military Band	
2330				
2331	Sing Rock-A-Bye Baby To Me		Will Oakland	
2332	On The Banks Of Lovelight Bay		Clark & Randolph	
2333	Off with the old love, on with the new	Macdonald-Carrol	Walter van Brunt	1914
2334	Hesitate Me Around, Bill		Collins & Harlan	1914
2335	He's Working In The Movies Now		Billy Murray	1914
2336	In The Heart Of A City That Has No Heart		Irving Gillette	1914
2337	Panama Exposition – accordion solo		Pietro Frosini	
2337	The Wedding Of The Rose		American Standard Orchestra	
2338	Norah McNamara		Eugene Emmett	
2339	Traumerei & Romance	Robert Schumann	Elias Breeskin, vin	1914
2340	Sans souci — Maxixe Brazilian	Green	National Promenade Band	1914
2341	Farewell		Emory B. Randolph	1914
2342	Believe Me, If All Those Endearing Young Charms		Kitty Berger- Harp-Zither.	
2343	The Passing Of Salome – Waltz Hesitation		National Promenade Band	
2344	On the Shores of Italy	Al Piantadosi – Dave Oppenheim – Jack Glogau	Albert C. Campbell & Irving Gillette	1914
2345	Dream Girl O' Mine		Reed Miller	
2346	He'd Have To Get Under. Get Out And Get Under – Medley		National Promenade Band	1923
2347	Chicken Reel	Daly	Edward Meeker	`1914
2348	Pepper Pot		National Prominade Band	1914
2349	If Your Heart Keeps Right		Homer Rodeheaver	1914
2350	I Walk With The King		Homer Rodeheaver	1914
2351	Mother's Prayers Have Followed Me		Homer Rodeheaver	1914
2352	My Father Watches Over Me	Chas. H. Gabriel	Homer Rodeheaver & Chorus	
2353	The Old Fashioned Faith		Homer Rodeheaver	
2354	Somebody Cares		Homer Rodeheaver	
2355	Favorite Airs From " Olivette"		Edison Light Opera Co.	
2356	A Real Moving Picture From Life		Walter Van Brunt	
2357	On The Banks Of The Brandywine		Eugene Emmett	
2358	Beauty's eyes	Tosti	Arthur Blight	1914
2359	Will O' The Wisp - Polka		Henry Heidelberg & Eugene Rose, pics.	1914
2360	While They Were Dancing Around		Irving Kaufman	1914
2361	The Whistling Coquette		Jones & Murray	1914
2362	Sunshine And Rain		Mildred Hartley	1914
2363	Springtime	Troostwyk	Hendrika Troostwy, vin	1914
2364	Do You Remember?		Irving Gillette	1914
2365	Hark, Hark My Soul		Edison Mixed Qrt	1914
2366	You Broke My Heart To Pass The Time Away		Manuel Romain	1914
2367	On The High Alps		Venetian Instrumental Qrt.	1914
2368	A Perfect Day		Metropolitan Quartet	1914
2369	That Reuben Tango Huskin' Bee		Byron Harlan	1914
2370	Looking This Way	J. W. Van De Venter	Elizabeth Spencer & F. Eleanor Patterson	1914
2371	Kathlyn – Waltz Hesitation		National Promenade Band	1914
2372	Harmony Bay		Campbell & Gillette	1914
2373	Happy Tho' Married		Fred Duprez	1914
2374	Amapa maxixe — Tango Brazilian	Storini	National Promenade Band	1914
2375	This is the Life	Irving Berlin	Billy Murray	1914
2376	Three For Jack	Squire-Weatherly	Edwin Wain	1914
2377	Down Home Rag – One -Step		Van Eps' Trio	1914
2378	Me And Mandy		Lee Collins And Harlan	1914
2379	Who Paid The Rent For Mrs. Rip Van Winkle Medley-Turkey Trot		National Promenade Band	1914
2380	Stick To Your Mother, Tom		Will Oakland	1914
2381	Ballet from "William Tell"		Edison Concert Band	1914
2382	Whistling Pete – Vaudeville Sketch		Billy Golden and Joe Hughes	1914
2383	Baby Mine		Elizabeth Spencer	
2384	Buck Dance - Melody		John J. Kimmel, acc	1914
2385	Aeroplane Dip – Waltz Hesitation		National Promenade Band	1914
2386	Mary, You're A Little Bit Old Fashioned		Walter Van Brunt	1914
2387	Recessional		Edison Mixed Quartette	1914
2388	The Rose Of The Mountain Trail		Vernon Archibald	1914
2389	Grande Valse De Concert		Edison Concert (Reed) Band	1914
2390	Everybody Loves My Girl		Irving Kaufman	1914
2391	If They'd Only Move Old Ireland Over Here		Edward Favor & Chorus	1914
2392	All On Account Of You		Irving Gillette	1914
2393	Hearts and Flowers		Venetian Inst Quartet	1914
2394	'Twas In September		Jones & Murray	1914
2395	When You Play in the Game of Love	Joe Goodwin – Al Piantadosi	Manuel Romain	1914
2396	The Blue Jay And The Thrush		Harlan & Belmont	
2397	This Is The Life Medley – Turkey Trot		Nation Promenade Band	
2398	In The Palace Of Dreams		Clark & Randolph	
2399	Kentucky Babe		Manhattan Quartet	1914
2400	Lorena		Metropolitan Quartet	
2401	The Dorothy – Three Step		National Prominade Band	
2402	Over The Alpine Mountains		Campbell & Gillette	
2403	The Wanderer		Walter Van Brunt	
2404	Something Seems Tingle-Ingling	Otto Harbach – Rudolf Friml	Walter Van Brunt	
2405	Humoreske (Dvorak)		Samuel Gardner, vln.	
2406	He'd Push It Along		Edward Meeker	
2407	Castle House Rag One-Step		Band	
2408	Mooching Along		Collins & Harlan	
2409	Bedtime At The Zoo		Ada Jones	
2410	By The Dear Old River Rhine		Campbell & Gillette	
2411	Patrol Comique		American Standard Orc.	
2412	March Of The Inland Tribes		Liberati's Band	
2413	Suffragettes March		Liberati's Band	
2414	La Mia Seperanza Valse		Liberati's Band	
2415	Royal Australian Navy March		New York Military Band	
2416	Ma Pickaninny Babe		Will Oakland	
2417	Favorite Airs from "The Beggar Student"		Edison Light Opera Co.	
2418	The Lover And The Bird		Mary Carson	
2419	Mother Machree (Violin)		Charles D'Almaine	
2420	Trust And Obey		Edison Mixed Quartet	
2421	Scene De Ballet		Edison Concert Band	
2422	When It's Moonlight On The Alamo		Campbell & Gillette	
2423	Valse June		National Promenade Band	
2424	Christ My All		Young & Wheeler	
2425	You're More Than The World To Me		Manuel Romain	
2426	Beautiful Roses		Young & Wheeler	
2427	Wedding Of The Winds -Waltz		American Standard Orchestra	
2428	When the Angelus is Ringing	Joe Young – Bert Grant	Irving Gillette	
2429	Jimmy Trigger's Return From Mexico		Golden & Hughes	
2430	The Robin And The Wren		Harlan & Belmont	
2431	Castle's Half And Half		National Prominade Band	
2432	Tramp! Tramp! Tramp!		Knickerbocker Quartet	
2433	L'Eclair – Romance		Kitty Berger, harp-zither	
2434	Mignon-Polonaise		Guido Gialdini, whi	
2435	Too Much Ginger – One Step		National Promenade Band	
2436	Basket Of Roses		Charles Daab. bells	
2437	When It's Night Time Down In Burgundy		Clark & Van Brunt	
2438	God Save the King		N.M. Band & P. Dawson	
2439	La Marseillaise		New York Military Band	
2440	Beyond the Smiling and the Weeping			
2441	Kamenoi Ostrow		American Standard Orc.	1914
2442	Zampa Overture	Hérold	Edison Concert Band	1914
2443	Die Wacht Am Rhein		Edison Concert Band	1914
2444	The Post In The Forest		Heim & Waldhorn Quartet, cnt & French horn	
2445	Tickle Toes – One Step		National Promenade Band	
2446	First Love – Waltz Hesitation		National Promenade Band	
2447	Massa's In De Cold, Cold Ground		Metropolitan Quartet	
2448	Roll Them Cotton Bales	James W. Johnson – J. Rosamond Johnson	Premier Quartette	
2449	Let's Grow Old Together, Honey		Manuel Romain	
2450	Sweet Spirit, Hear My Prayer		Marie Narelle	
2451	Navajo Indian songs — Lecture with examples	Traditional; adapted by O'Hara		1914
2452	loves sorrow	Shelley	Emory B Randolph	1914
2453	Somewhere a Voice is Calling		Spencer & Archibald	
2454	Love's Dream After The Ball		Elizabeth Spencer	
2455	Meet me 'neath the Persian moon	Woolf-Friedland	Walter van Brunt	1914
2456	My Croony Melody		Collins & Harlan	
2457	In The Evening By The Moonlight, Dear Louise		Harvey Hindermeyer	
2458	Humpty Dumpty Rag		New York Military Band	
2459	Since I Am Your Auntie To Be, from "The Midnight Girl"		Spencer & Van Brunt	
2460	Dreams Of The Prisoner		Collins & Harlan	
2461	The Soldiers of The King		Joseph A. Phillips	
2462	Love's Last Word		Walter Van Brunt w/chorus	
2463	A Little More Pepper-One Step		National Prominade Band	
2464	The Night Before Christmas		Harry Humphrey	
2465	L'Elegante Polka- xyl		Charles Daab	
2466	Jocelyn	P.A. Silvestre – Victor Capoul – Lamartine – Benjamin Godard	Elizabeth Spencer	
2467	L'Estudiantina – Waltz Hesitation		National Prominade Band	
2468	The Aba Daba Honeymoon	Arthur Fields & Walter Donovan	Arthur Collins & Byron G. Harlan	
2469	Die Wacht Am Rhein & Deutschland Uber Alirs		Manhattan Qrt.	
2470	Reuben-Fox Trot		National Promenade Band	
2471	I Want To Go Back To Michigan		National Promenade Band	
2472	Come To Me		Clark & Archibald	
2473	Spring Of Love		Venetian Instrumental Quartet	1914
2474	Una Noche De Garufa Tango		Banda	
2475	Adoration (Violin)		Richard Czerwonky	
2476	The Birth Of A King -Christmas Song		Thomas Chalmers & Chorus	
2477	The music of love	Rubens; interpolated in "The Girl from Utah	Marie Kaiser & Reed Miller	1914
2478	O Come, All Ye Faithful		Edison Mixed Quartet	
2479	Do The Funny Fox Trot		National Promenade Band	
2480	Ballin' The Jack		National Promenade Band	
2481	Roses Remind Me Of Someone		Clough	1914
2482	Hark! The Herald Angles Sing		Edison Mixed Quartet	
2483	Russian & Belgian National Airs		New York Military Band	
2484	Dost thou know that sweet land?	Thomas	Marie Morrisey	1914
2485	The Boat With My True Love's Name		Clark & Archibald	
2486	Rule Britannia		Albert Farrington	
2487	It's a Long, Long Way to Tipperary	Jack Judge	Albert Farrington & Male Chorus	1914
2488	By The Setting Of The Sun		Walter Van Brunt	
2489	Meadowbrook – Fox Trot		National Promenade Band	
2490	I'm Going Back To Louisiana		Billy Murray	
2491	When The Green Leaves Turn To Gold		Spencer & Van Brunt	
2492	Lu Lu – Fado		National Prominade Band	
2493	My Dream Of Dreams		Marie Kaiser	
2494	Fairest Rose		Charles Daab	
2495	Mrs. Sippi, You're A Grand Old Girl		Clark & Murry	
2496	The Girl from Utah One-Step		Band	
2497	When The Roses Bloom		Spencer & Randolph	
2498	Messiah- Comfort Ye, My People		Reed Miller	
2499	Messiah-Every valley shall be exalted		Reed Miller	

== Edison Blue Amberols 2500–3499 ==
Issue number	Title	Writer(s)	Performer(s)	Date
2500	Rinaldo – Leave Me To Languish	George Frideric Handel	Adelaide Fischer	1914
2501	California and You		Billy Murray & Chorus	
2502	Love's Melody		Elizabeth Spencer and Emory Randolph	1915
2503	Tao Tao One-Step Chinese Dance		National Promenade Band	
2504	La Bohème – Waltz Song		Guido Gialdini . whi:	
2505	Vulcan Song		T. Foster Why	
2506	Weber's Last Thought – Fantasia		Gustave Heim, cnt.	
2507	I Want to Go Back to Michigan, Down On the Farm	Irving Berlin	Billy Murray	
2508	Because & Yesterday and Today		Charles Granville	
2509	Come back to me	Von Tilzer		
2510	I'm On My Way To Dublin Bay		Premier Quartet	
2510	When The Ebb Tiede Flows		Knickerbocker Qrt	
2511	Rose of Italy	Lyons-Yosco	Walter van Brunt	1915
2512	Martha – The Last Rose of Summer		Elizabeth Spencer	1915
2513	He's a Rag Picker	Irving Berlin	Peerless Quartet	
2514	The Dodo Dawdle		National Promenade Band	
2515	In Siam	Manuel Klein	Billy Murray	
2516	For You		Clark & Archibald	
2517	Love Moon		Elizabeth Spencer & Walter Van Brunt	
2518	Amazonia — Polka Bresilienne	Pinto	National Promenade Band	1915
2519	Last night when you said good-bye	Wilson	Marie Morrisey	1915
2520	Is It Enough, from "Elijah"		Frederic Martin	
2521	Violet (Caryll; "Chin-Chin")		Mary Carson	1915
2522	The dear old songs of long ago	Force	Emory B. Randolph	1915
2523	Le Rouli-Rouli	Jean Schwartz	National Promenade Band	
2524	Oh Promise Me		Anton Weiss, flugelhorn	
2525	Funiculi Funicula		C. W. Harrison	
2526	Grandfather's Clock		Helen Clark & Walter Van Brunt	
2527	Rienzi Overture		Brass Orchestra	
2528	As You Please		Jaudas' Society Orc.	
2529	Tannhauser March	Richard Wagner	Edison Concert Band	
2530	Sister Susie's Sewing Shirts for Soldiers	R. P. Weston – Herman E. Darewski	Billy Murray	
2531	Echoes From The Movies		J. P. Frosini, acc	
2532	Roll On, Beautiful World, Roll On		Arthur Crane	
2533	Skating Trot – One Step		National Promenade Band	
2534	Sally In Our Alley		Knickerbocker quartet	
2535	One Wonderful Night		Kaiser & Randolph	
2536	My Lady Of The Telephone		Joseph Philips & Chorus	
2537	Panama Exposition March		J. P. Frosini, acc	
2538	Operatic Rag		Sodero's Band	
2539	Out To Old Aunt Mary's		Harry Humphrey	
2540	Teenie, Eenie, Weenie from "Suzi"		Clark & Phillips	
2541	Loreley Paraphrase		American Symphony Orchestra	
2542	My Melancholy Baby	George A. Norton – Ernie Burnett	Walter Scanlan	
2543	Huguenots-Benediction of the Poignards		Edison Concert Band	
2544	Way Down on Tampa Bay		Owen J. McCormack	
2545	Cecile – Waltz Hesitation		National Prominade Band	
2546	Ah! 'tis a dream.	(Lassen)	Thomas Chalmers	1915
2547	When You Wore a Tulip	Jack Mahoney m. Percy Wenrich	Walter Van Brunt	
2548	Goodbye Girls I'm Through	John Golden – Ivan Caryll	Owen J. McCormack	
2549	Paprika - Lu Lu Fado		National Promenade Band	
2550	It's Too Late Now		Collins & Harlan	
2551	Let Bygones Be Bygones		Clark & Archibald	
2552	Back To The Carolina You Love		Owen J. McCormack	
2553	The Heart of Paddy Whack – A Little it of Heaven		Frank X. Doyle	
2554	My Orchard Is Short Of A Peach Like You		Collins & Harlan	
2555	Tip-Top Tipperary Mary		J. A. Philips & Chorus	
2556	The Little Ford Rambled Right Along	Byron Gay	Billy Murray	
2557	There's a Bungalow in Dixieland		Morton Harvey	
2558	Let Us Have Peace		Phillip Wolfram	
2559	The Carnival – One Step		Jaudas' Society Orc	
2560	The Sorrows of Death		William Pagdin	
2561	On the 5:15	Stanley Murphy – Henry I. Marshall	Pete Murray	
2562	Back To The Carolina You Love		Owen J. McCormack	1915
2563	Brown October Ale, from "Robin Hood"		Thomas Chalmers	
2564	The Jolly Coppersmith		New York Military Band	
2565	That's An Irish Lullaby		Manuel Romain	1915
2566	If with all your hearts — Recitative and aria	Mendelssohn	Reed Miller	1915
2567	Italian Fantasia		Frosini	1915
2568	His lullaby	(Jacobs-Bond)	Mary Jordan	1915
2569	Hearts and Flowers		American Standard Orc.	1915
2570	Those days of long ago	Plotzman; "Hop o' My Thumb	Walter van Brunt	1915
2571	Walter van Brunt	Arndt	Van Eps Banjo Orchestra	1915
2572	Someone		E. Spencer & Archibald	
2573	In the Sweet Bye and Bye		Chalmers & Cho.	
2574	Millicent Waltz Hesitation		Jauda's Society Orchestra	
2575	After The Roses Have Faded Away	Ernes R. Ball	Helen Clark & Joseph A. Phillips	
2576	Doodle-oodle Dee		Collins & Harlan	
2577	Genius Loci (Thern)		American String Qrt.	
2578	Jesus Christ Is Risen To-Day		Mixed Quartette	1915
2579	Day Of Resurrection		Edison Mixed Quartet	
2580	I Didn't Raise My Boy To Be A Soldier	Alfred Bryan – Al Piantadosi	Helen Clark	1915
2581	Tennessee, I Hear You Calling Me		Premier Quartet	1915
2582	La Russe		Jaudas' Society Orc	
2583	The Armorer's Song, from "Robin Hood"		Fredric Martin	
2584	Old Folks At Home		Christine Miller	
2585	It's written in the book of destiny	Schroeder; "Lady Luxury"	Helen Clark & Joseph A. Phillips	1915
2586	Little House Upon the Hill	Ballard Macdonald – Joe Goodwin – Harry Puck	Manuel Romain	1915
2587	Happy, That's All		Van Avery	1915
2588	I'm a millionaire	Rubens; "Tonight's the Night	Joseph A. Phillips	1915
2589	Love's Melody Waltz - Boston or Hesitation		Jaudas' Society Orc	
2590	After Sunset		Edison Concert Band	
2591	The Same Sort Of Girl		Spencer & Van Brunt	
2592	Love's Golden Dream		Clark & Randolph	
2593	Some Baby - One Step		Van Eps's Banjo Orchestra	
2594	My Sunshine (O Sole Mio)		Charles W. Harrison	
2595	At the ball, that's all	Hill; Ziegfeld's "Follies of 1913"	Harry Tally & Harry Mayo	1915
2596	You're plenty up-to-date for me	van Brunt	Walter van Brunt	1915
2597	The Dying Poet		Sodero's Band	
2598	The Insect Powder Agent		Golden & Marlowe	
2599	The Heart of Paddy Whack – Irish Eyes of Love		Frank X. Doyle	
2600	When I'm Gone You'll Soon Forget		Van Brunt & Helen Clark	
2601	Vigoroso march	Losey	New York Military Band	1915
2602	O That We Two Were Maying		E. Spencer & Chalmers	
2603	In The Garden Of The Gods		Thomas Chalmers	
2604	The Music Box Rag		Jaudas' Society Orc.	
2605	The Ancient Order of Hibernians of the USA	Jack Glogau	Edward Meeker	
2606	A night's frolic	Hermann	Sodero's Band	1915
2607	Play a Simple Melody	Irving Berlin	Mary Carson & Walter Van Brunt	
2608	Flaming Arrow		Edison Concert Band	
2609	Lucia di Lammermoor – Sextette		Sodero's Band	
2610	I'm On My Way To Dublin Bay		Premier Quartet	
2611	The Nightingale Song—Coronet Solo		Bach	
2612	Humoreske song (Koockogey; from Dvorák)		Walter van Brunt	1915
2613	The violin my great-granddaddy made	Erdman	George Wilton Ballard	1915
2614	Friend	Davies	Frederick J. Wheeler	1915
2615	At The Yiddish Wedding Jubilee		Maurice Burkhart	1915
2616	Alone In The Deep		Knickerbocker Quarte.	1915
2617	My Old Kentucky Home		Thomas Chalmers	1915
2618	Through The Air		Weyert A. Moore, pic.	1915
2619	My bugler boy	Darewski-Weston	Helen Clark	1915
2620	Tickling Love Taps - foxtrot		Jaudas' Society Orc.	1915
2621	Bid me to love	Barnard-Bingham	Emory B. Randolph	1915
2622	Don't Take My Darling Boy Away		Clark & Phillips	
2623	In the Hills of Old Kentucky		Morton Harvey	
2624	La Furlana Italiana		National Promenade Band	
2625	Liebesfreud	Kreisler	Richard Czerwonky (violin)	1915
2626	Tannhauser – Pilgrims' Chorus		Metropolitan Mixed Chorus	
2627	Hey Wop!		George L. Thompson	
2628	What is Love	Irving Berlin	Elizabeth Spencer & Cho.	
2629	I Want to go to Tokio		Maybelle Mac Donald & Walter Van Brunt	
2630	An old sweetheart of mine	Riley	Harry E. Humphrey	1915
2631	America (My Country 'Tis Of Thee)		Metropolitan Quartet	
2632	When The Daffodils Are Blooming		Metropolitan Quartet	
2633	Listen To The Dixie Band		Irving Kaufman & Chorus	
2634	I'm Dreaming Of You		Ward Barton	1915
2635	Little Grey Home In The West		Emory Randolph	
2636	Desperate Desmond (Rehearsing the Orchestra}		Fred Duprez	
2637	Auntie Skinner's Chicken Dinner		Collins & Harlan	
2638	Land Of Dreams & You		Walter Van Brunt	
2639	The Only Girl		Jaudas' Society Orc.	
2640	There Must Be Little Cupids In The Briny		Billy Murray	
2641	I Didn't Raise My Boy To Be A Soldier		Jaudas' Society Orc.	
2642	Maritana: Oh Maritana	Wallace	Louis Katzman & Simone Mantia (cornet & trombone)	1915
2643	Love Is King Of Everything		Reed Miller	1915
2644	United Service Passing In Review		Sousa' Band	
2645	Pick A Chicken		Jaudas' Society Orchestra	
2646	Laughing Love—Whistling Solo			
2647	Oh, How That Woman Could Cook		Maurice Burkhart	
2648	Indiana		Van Brunt & Cho.	
2649	Song of the chimes — Cradle song	Worrell	Beatrice Collin	1915
2650	On My Way To New Orleans		Collins & Harlan	
2651	Andante In F		W Moor	1915
2652	The Star Spangled Banner		Thomas Chalmers	
2653	King Of The Air March		Charles Daab, xyl.	
2654	I'm On My Way To Dublin Bay		Judas' Society Orchestra	
2655	Are You the O'Reilly?		Billy Murray	
2656	Rippling Waters		Brass Orch.	1915
2657	War Talk At Pun'kin Center		Cal Stewart	
2658	There's a Little Spark of Love Still Burning	Joe McCarthy – Fred Fisher	Walter Van Brunt	
2659	Forgotten		Thomas Chalmers	
2660	Norma-Hear Me, Norma		Spindler, flute & Glammatteo, cla.	
2661	Good-Bye Everybody from " A Modern Eve"		Clark & Phillips	
2662	As We Parted At The Gate		Hindemeyer & Chalmers	
2663	Alabama Jubilee	Jack Yellen & George L. Cobb	Arthur Collins & Byron G. Harlan	
2664	My Heart At Thy Sweet Voice		Albert Witcomb, cnt.	
2665	II Bacio		Mary Carson	
2666	Shadowland — Fox trot	Gilbert	Jaudas' Society Orchestra	1915
2667	Make Up Your Mind, Maggie MacKenzie		Glen Ellison	
2668	Lohengrin - Introduction to Act 3	Richard Wagner	American Standard Orchestra	
2669	Valse fantastique — Hesitation	Eville	Jaudas' Society Orchestra	1915
2670	Apple Blossoms		American Symphony Orchestra	
2671	Ma Curly-Headed Baby		Beatrice Collin & Chorus	
2672	Some Little Girl Named Mary		Irving Kaufman	
2673	Drifting With The Silver Tide		Clark & Wheeler	1915
2674	Bird imitations		Charles Crawford Gorst	1915
2675	Ever Of Thee I'm Fondly Dreaming	Foley Hall	Elizabeth Spencer and Thomas Chalmers	1915
2676	Take me back to your heart	Godfrey-David-Wright	George Wilton Ballard	1915
2677	My Little Dream Girl		Walter Van Brunt	
2678	Quiet Little Evenings At Home		Walter Van Brunt	
2679	Josephine Polka		Oberammergauer Zither Trio	
2680	When I Was A Dreamer And You Were My Dream		George Ballard	
2681	Where's the girl for me?	Winterberg; "The Lady in Red"	Frederick J. Wheeler	1915
2682	La Gioconda: La furlana	(Ponchielli)	Sodero's Band	1915
2683	That was the end of my dream	David-stroud	Hardy Williamson	1915
2684	Gasoline Gus & And His Jitney Bus		Billy Murray & Chorus	1915
2685	Ula Like No Alike – Melody of Hawaiian Hulas		Frank Ferera, Hawaiian gtr	
2686	Love Me As You Used To Love Me		Reed Miller	
2687	Hello, Frisco!	Gene Buck – Louis A. Hirsch	Harvey Hindermeyer & Helen Clark	
2688	The drummer boy	German	Reed Miller	1915
2689	Hold your hand out, naughty boy	Murphy-David	Glen ellison	1915
2690	Peer Gynt Suite NO. 1, Part 1 Morning. Part 3, Anitra's Dance (Grieg)		Sodero's Band	1915
2691	Scheduled for a Sep 1915 release, then cancelled and subsequently issued as 2812			
2692	Beautiful Lady in Red		Emory Randolph & Chorus	1915
2693	By Heck – Fox Trot	L. Wolfe Gilbert – S. R. Henry	Jaudas' Society Orch.	
2694	She Lies Down In Our Ally		Irving Kaufman	
2695	We'll Build A Little Home In The U.S.A.		Irving Kaufman & Chorus	
2696	I Like Your Town		Glen Ellison	
2697	The Three Bears – Bedtime Story		Edna Bailey	
2698	Peer Gynt suite No. 1	Greig	Sodero's Band	1915
2699	Victoria Regia – Concert Waltz		Weyert A. Moor, flute	
2700	My Little Girl	Sam M. Lewis – William Dillon – Albert Von Tilzer	Arthur C. Lichty	
2701	Aloha Oe – Waltz Medley		W. Smith & W. Kolomoku, Hawaiian gtrs.	
2702	Fairy Tales Overture		Edison Concert Band	
2703	Welcome To California		Owen J. McCormack	
2704	Destiny Waltz		Jaudas' Society Orc.	
2705	Sailing On The Good Ship Sunshine		Irving Kaufman	
2706	Spring's Awakening		Mary Carson	
2707	It's Tulip Time In Holland		Arthur Lichty	
2708	The Gladiator March		New York Military Band	
2709	Over the hills to Mary		Walter van Brunt	
2710	Asleep In The Deep	Wells	William Meyer	1915
2711	Open The Gates To The Temple		Hardy Williamson	
2712	Dance of the Skeletons		Sodero's Band	
2713	Robert's Globe Trot- Fox Trot		Jauda's Society Orchestra	
2714	Climbing Up De Golden Stairs		Walter Van Brunt	
2715	The Birds and the Brook		American Symphony Orch.	
2716	Circus Day In Dixie		Premier Quartet	
2717	There's a little white church in the valley	Lange	Irving Kaufman and chorus	1915
2718	Carmena	Wilson-richards	Metropolitan quartet	1915
2719	Daisies Won't Tell		Helen Clark & J. Phillips	
2720	Which Switch is the Switch, Miss, For Ipswich?		Billy Murray	
2721	Wee Little House		Glen Ellison	
2722	A Little Pep! - One Step		Sodero's Band	
2723	The Relic Hunters		Golden & Marlowe	
2724	Firefly		Irving Kaufman	
2725	Chasse Aux Papillons		Wayert A. Moor, flute	
2726	Waipio Medley—Hawaiian Guitar		Smith & Kolomoku	
2727	My Big Little Soldier Boy		Glen Ellison	
2728	Absent	Metcalf	Hardy williamson	1915
2729	A Flower Of Italy		Isidore Moskowitz, vin	1915
2730	Garden of Roses Waltz		Band	
2731	Twinkle Waltz		Charles Daab	
2732	If You Can't Sing The Words, You Must Whistle The Tune		Billy Murray	
2733	Spring flowers	Mattiozzi	Mary Carson	1915
2734	Ragging The Scale - Fox Trot		Jauda's' Society Orchestra	
2735	Where the Water Lilies Grow		Royal, Fish, & Cho.	
2736	My hula maid	Edwards; "Passing Show of 1915"	Gladys Rice & Irving Kaufman	1915
2737	Woodland songsters — Waltz	zeihrer	American Symphony Orchestra Whistling: Joe Belmont	1915
2738	Mother Machree		Walter Van Brunt	
2739	The Porcupine Rag		New York military Band	
2740	Ah, Could I But Once More So Love, Dear		Emory Randolph	
2741	They did the Goose – Step Home		Irving Kaufman	
2742	Parla Waltz		Guido Gialdini, whi.	
2743	Dat's What I Call Music		Edna Bailey	
2744	Gypsy Baron. Treasure Waltz		Hungarian Orchestra	
2745	You're My Girl		Walter Van Brunt & Helen Clark	
2746	We'll Never Let The Old Flag Down		Fredrick J. Wheeler	
2747	Call of the Motherland		F. J. Wheeler	
2748	We'll Have A Jubilee in My Old Kentucky Home		Billy Murray & Chorus	
2749	When I Leave the World Behind	Irving Berlin	Glen Ellison	
2750	Emancipation Handicap - Descriptive		Collins & Harlan	
2751	That's the Song of Songs For Me		Walter Van Brunt	
2752	Waltz of the seasons	Romberg; "The Blue Paradise")	George Wilton Ballard & Frederick J. Wheeler	1915
2753	Somebody Knows	H. von Tilzer	Harry Tally & Harry Mayo	1915
2754	Andante pastorale — Souvenir des Alpes	Böhm, op. 31	Weyert A. Moor (flute)	1915
2755	Coronation March from "Prophete"		Sodero's Band	
2756	I'am A Lonesome- Melody		George Ballard & Chorus	
2757	Whistling Rufus- One Step		Jauda's Society Orchestra	
2758	The Trumpeter of Sackingen - Parting Song		Louis Katzman, cnt.	
2759	They Didn't Believe Me	Herbert Reynolds – Jerome Kern	Gladys Rice & Walter Van Brunt	
2760	Scene At The Dog Fight- Descriptive		Girard & Porter	
2761	All Aboard For The Country Fair		Harlan Knight & Co.	
2762	The Little Grey Mother		James Doherty & Chorus	
2763	In The Land Of Love With The Song Birds		George Wilton Ballard & Owen J. McCormack	1915
2764	Auntie Skinner's Chicken Dinner – Medley		Sisty & Seitz's Banjo Orchestra	1915
2765	The Last Waltz		Sisty & Seitz's Banjo Orchestra	1915
2766	Chimes of Normandy Airs, No. 2		NY Light Opera Co.	1915
2767	O Little Town of Bethlehem		Carol Singers	1915
2768	Once In Royal David's City		Carol Singers	1915
2769	It Came Upon A Midnight Clear		Carol Singers	1915
2770	O Come, All Ye Faithful		Sodero's Band	
2771	Angels from the realms of glory	smart	carol singets	1915
2772	Dominion Of Canada March		Sodero's Band	
2773	Keep the Home Fires Burning 'Till The Boys Come Home	Lena Guilbert Ford – Ivor Novello	Frederick J. Wheeler	
2774	Are We Downhearted? No!		Elizabeth Spencer	
2775	Auf Wiedersehen, from " The Blue Paradise"		Lenihan & Rice	1916
2776	When Old Bill Bailey Plays the Ukulele	Charles McCarron & Nathaniel Vincent	Billy Murray	
2777	Daybreak At Calamity Farm		Gilbert Girard & Co.	
2778				
2779				
2780	With Sword And Lance – March		New York Military Band	
2781				
2782	Omena - Intermezzo		Fred Van Eps, bjo	
2783	Kaiser Fredrich March		New York Military Band	
2784	Good-Bye, Virginia		George Ballard	
2785				
2786	Blue-White March		New York Military Band	
2787	My Wild Irish Rose		Walter Van Brunt	
2788				
2789	Lauterbach and Hi-Le-Hi Lo With Yodels		George Watson	
2790				
2791	Cohen Owes Me Ninety-Seven Dollars		Maurice Burkhart	
2792				
2793	Battle Of The Nations		N.Y. Military Band	1915
2794	On The Bark Of The Old Cherry Tree		George Ballard	
2795	Song Of Hybrias The Cretan		T. Foster Why	
2796				
2797	Molly Dear, It's You I'm After	Frank Wood – Henry E. Pether	Walter Van Brunt	
2798				
2799	I'd Rather Be A Lamp-post On Old Broadway		Billy Murray	
2800	Pretty Edelweiss, from "Alone At Last"		Mary Carson	
2801	Cuddles		Sodero's Band	
2802	Sometimes A Dream Comes True		Walter Van Brunt	
2803	The Nightingale's Song		Helen Clark & Chorus	
2804	Henry Gibson's Narrow Escape		Golden & Marlowe	
2805	She's The Daughter of Mother Machree		Burton Lenihan	
2806	Young America, We're Strong For You		Irving Kaufman & Chorus	
2807	Bridal Blushes – Waltz		Jauda's Society Orchestra	
2808				
2809	Medley of J. K. Emmett's Yodel Songs		George Watson	
2810	Ben Hur Chariot Race March		New York Military Band	
2811	There's A Little Lane Without A Turn On The Way To Home, Sweet Home		George Ballard & Chorus	
2812	Henry & Hank At The Levee		Kaufman Brothers	1916
2813	Mr. Silver Moon	Weberbauer	Gladys Rice & Irving Kaufman	1916
2814	M-O-T-H-E-R, A Word That Means The World To Me	Howard Johnson m. Theodore F. Morse	George Wilton Ballard	
2815	Cohen at the Telephone		George Thompson	1916
2816	My Sweet Little Colleen		Walter Van Brunt	1916
2817	Along the Rocky Road to Dublin		Premier Quartet	
2818	Melody in F (Rubenstein)		Isidore Moskowitz, vin	
2819	Just Try to Picture Me (Back Home in Tennessee)	William Jerome m. Walter Donaldson	George Wilton Ballard	
2820	Help The Other Fellow		Knickerbocker Quartet	
2821	The Allies March To Freedom		C. Ballard & Male Chorus	
2822	Cheery O'		Fredrick Wheeler	
2823	Some Little Bug is Going To Find You Someday		Walter Van Brunt	
2824	Back Home in Tennessee		Vecsey's Hungarian Orc.	
2825	I'm On My Way To Dublin Bay		New York Military Band	
2826	The Mocking Bird	Richard Milburn – Septimus Winner	Elizabeth Spencer & Walter Van Brunt	
2827	Loading Up The Mandy Lee		Premier Qrt.	
2828	The Nightingale		Metropolitan Qrt.	
2829	Universal Fox Trot		Ossman's Banjo Orc	
2830	Sons Of Mother Earth		Weary Willie Trio	
2831	Could the Dreams of a Dreamer Come True?		George Ballard	
2832	The Bells Of Lee		Helen Clark	
2833	Ciribiribin		Sodero's Band	
2834	I'm Dreaming Of You		Ward Barton	
2835	There's a Long, Long Trail	Stoddard King – Zo Elliott	George Wilton Ballard & Chorus	
2836	Hezekiah — Cakewalk	Richardson	National Promenade Band	1916
2837	Iolanthe Airs—Part 1	Gilbert & Sullivan	New York Light Opera Company	
2838	And The Great Big World Went Around		Collins & Harlan	
2839	I Love a Piano, from "Stop! Look! Listen"	Irving Berlin	Walter Van Brunt	
2840	In Monterey	Daniels, as Morét; Williams; "Tonight's the Night"	Burton Lenihan	1916
2841	A little love, a little kiss (Would go a long, long way)	hill	Helen Clark & Joseph A. Phillips	1916
2842	I've Been Floating Down the Old Green River	Bert Kalmar – Joe Cooper	Billy Murray	
2843	America, I Love You – March		New York Military Band	
2844	Lorna		Emory Randolph	
2845	When I Get Back To The U.S.A. from "Stop!, Look! Listen"		Billy Murray	
2846	Ye Happy Bells Of Easter Day		Carol Singers	
2847	Let The Merry Church Bells Ring		Carol Singers	
2848	Attila—"Praise Ye" Grand Trio		Sodero's Band	
2849	Wait 'till the Clouds Roll By		Walter Van Brunt	
2850	The girl who smiles — Medley waltz	Briquet-Philipp	Jaudas' Society Orchestra	1916
2851	Molly Dear, It's You I Am After – Melody One-Step		National Promenade Band	
2852	In The Gloaming		Emory Randolph	
2853	Massa's In De Cold Cold Ground		Fred Bacon, bjo	
2854	Answer		Thomas Chalmers	
2855	That Hula Hula, from 'Stop, Look, Listen		Helen Clark & Chorus	
2856	Valse Pathétique		Armand Vecsey & His Hungarian Orchestra	1916
2857	Go To Sleep, My Little Pickaninny		Gladys Rice	
2858	Merry Whirl – One Step		Ossman's Banjo Qrt.	
2859	You'll Always Be The Same Sweet Girl		Manuel Romain	
2860	La Reine de Saba-Sous les pieds d'une femme		T. Foster Why	
2861	Iolanthe Airs—Part 2	W.S. Gilbert – A.S. Sullivan	New York Light Opera Company	
2862	Honey I Wants Yer Now & Jerusalen Morning		Criterion Qrt.	
2863	Hungarian Serenade		Allessio's Mandolin Qrt	
2864	My Mother's Rosary		Walter Van Burnt	
2865	Underneath The Stars		Jaudas' Society Orc.	
2866	Around The Map - Fox Trot		Jaudas' Society Orchestra	
2867	Juanita		Gladys Rice & Fredrick J. Wheeler	
2868	When The Right Girl Comes Along		Billy Murray w/chorus	
2869	Boys Of The Dardanelles		F. Wheeler & Chorus	
2870	For Auld Lang Syne, Australia Will Be There!		William White & Chorus	
2871	She Is My Rosie		Glen Ellison	1916
2872	Little Cotton Dolly		Criterion Quartet	
2873	Waltz orchid	caryll	Armand Vecsey & his Hungarian Orchestra	1916
2874	Played By A Military Band	Mohr	Billy Murray	1916
2875	What have I to give?	Lane	Emory B. Randolph	1916
2876	Spanish Rhapsody		Alessio's Mandolin Quartet	1916
2877	Memories	Gustave Kahn – Egbert Van Alstyne	Burton Lenihan	1916
2878	I Wonder If You Still Miss Me Sometimes		George Wilton Ballard	1916
2879	I Love You, That's One Thing I Know		Manuel Romain	1916
2880	Here Comes Tootsie		Gladys Rice	
2881	The Memphis Blues		National Promenade Band	1916
2882	Serenade		Venetian Instrumental Quartet	1916
2883	All Aboard For Chinatown		Collins & Harlan	1916
2884	Stop! Look! Listen!		Jaudas' Society Orchestra	
2885	Songs of Other Days, No. 1		Metropolitan Mixed Chorus	
2886	Babes in the woods — Fox trot	Kern; "Very Good, Eddie!"	Jaudas' Society Orchestra	1916
2887	Song Of The Soul		Marir Kaiser	
2888	Songs We Used to Sing In Dixie Land		Merle Alcock	
2889	Kitinka		Walter Van Brunt	
2890	Baby (Swing high, swing low)	Bennet	Helen Clark	1916
2891	Blow, Blow, Thou Winter Wind		T. Foster Why	1916
2892	The Creation With verdure clad		Marie Sundelius	
2893	Railroad Jim	Vincent	Edward Meeker	
2894	On The Hoko Moko Isle		Collins & Harlan	
2895	Strike Up A Song		Charles Granville	1916
2896	Songs Of Other Days, No 2		Metropolitan Mixed Chorus	
2897	I Can Dance with Everybody But My Wife	Joseph Cawthorn – John Golden	Billy Murray	
2898	Call me your darling again	Skelly	Elizabeth Spencer	1916
2899	I Seem To Hear You Gently Calling		Emory Randolph	
2900	Babes In The Wood, from "Very Good, Eddie"		Rice & Van Brunt	
2901	Silver Threads Among The Gold		Lou Chiha, "Frisco", xyl.	
2902	Wonderful Rose of Love		George Ballard	
2903	De Sandman & the Drum		Criterion Quartet	
2904	Battle Cry Of Freedom		Walter Van Brunt	
2905	Nanny (I have never loved another girl but you)	Lauder	Glen Ellison	1916
2906	Serenade from "Les Millions d 'Arlequin"		Vecsey's Hungarian Orchestra	
2907	The Lights Of My Home		Walter Van Brunt	1916
2908	Swing Along!	Cook, Will Marion	Orpheus Male Chorus	1916
2909	My Pretty Lena (Yode) Song)	W. Barton		
2910	Serenade	Schubert	Burton Lenihan	
2911	Aloha Oe Waltzes		Jaudas' Society Orchestra	
2912	Dixie		Metropolitan Quartet	
2913	What A Wonderful Mother You'd Be		Walter Van Brunt	
2914	Yankee Doodle		Metropolitan Mixed Chorus	
2915	America Fantasie		New York Military Band	
2916	Yaaka Hula Hickey Dula		Walter Van Brunt	
2917	Hawaiian Airs, No 1		Louise & Ferrera, Hawaiian gtrs.	
2918	Glen Ellison	Jacob	Jaudas' Society Orchestra	1916
2919	Wake Up, America!		Joseph Phillips	
2920	Since Mother Goes to the Movie Shows		Billy Murray	
2921	Are You Half The Man Your Mother Though You'd Be		Walter Van Brunt	
2922	First Heart Throbs		John F. Burchhardt, bells	
2923	When It's Orange Blossom Time in Loveland		George Ballard	
2924	Sing us a song of bonnie Scotland	Payne	Glen Ellison	1916
2925	Kangaroo Hop		Lou Chiha "Frisco" xyl.	
2926				
2927	Hilo March (Hawaiian Guitar)		Louise & Ferreira	
2928	Slidus Trombonus		Sodero's Band	
2929	Lullaby from "Jocelyn"		Ernest Albert Couturier, cnt	
2930	What's The Use Of Going Home?		Arthur Fields	
2931	Where Did Robinson Crusoe Go with Friday On Saturday Night?	Sam M. Lewis – Joe Young – George W. Meyer	Billy Murray	
2932				
2933	True To The Flag March		US Marine Band	
2934				
2935	The Letter That Never Reached Home		George Ballard	
2936	Setting The Pace- One Step		Jaudas' Society Orchestra	
2937				
2938	Johnny Get a Girl		Billy Murray & Chorus	1916
2939	The Italian Rosa		Lester Bernard	
2940	If I Knock the 'L" Out of Kelly		Ada Jones	
2941	Medley of Hawaiian Airs No. 2		Louise & Ferreira	
2942	Are You from Dixie, Cause I'm from Dixie Too	Jack Yellen – George L. Cobb	Billy Murray	
2943	A Love-Sick Coon		Golden & Marlowe	
2944	Keep off the grass (Banjo Solo)		Vossman Ossman	
2945	Serenade (Schubert)		Emst Albert Couturier, cnt.	
2946	My Bonnie, Bonnie Jean		Glen Ellison	
2947				
2948	Don't Bite the Hand That's Feeding You		Walter Van Brunt	
2949	So Long Letty		Clark & Phillips	
2950	The Missouri Waltz		Jauda's Society Orchestra	
2951				
2952	Winter Song		Criterion Quartet	
2953	There's A Quaker Down In Quaker Town		Joseph Phillips	
2954	She Sang Aloha To Me		Walter Van Brunt	
2955	A Spirit Flower		Emory Randolph	
2956	Hapa Haole Hula Girl (guitar duet)		Helen Louise and Frank Ferreira	
2957	Baby Shoes	Joe Goodwin – Ed Rose (lyricist) – Al Piantadosi	Elizabeth Spencer (soprano)	
2958	Hapa Haole Hula Girl		Louise & Ferrera, Hawaiian gtrs	
2959	When Irish Eyes Are Smiling		Walter Van Brunt	
2960				
2961	On The Hoko Moko Isle, Melody		Jaudas Society Orchestra	
2962	Sweet Cider Time, When You Were Mine		Joseph Phillips	
2963	Story of the Little Red Hen – Little Maud's Story		Alice Goddard	
2964	Fair Hawaii		Rice & Brunt	
2965	Oh! How She Could Yack! Hack! Wicki! Wack! Woo		Collins & Harlan	
2966				
2967	Walkin' the Dog - Fox Trot		National Promenade Band	
2968	A Gay Gossoon		Vess Ossman	
2969	Down Where The Swanee River Flows		George Ballard	
2970	Dublin Mary Brown		Irving Kaufman	
2971	On The Beach – Medley		Waikiki Hawaiian Orchestra	
2972	Luana Lou		Walter Van Brunt	
2973	Way Down In Borneo-o-o-o		Leonard Chick	
2974	You're a Dangerous Girl		Clark & Philips	
2975	Shades of Night		Spencer & Van Brunt	
2976	The Lily And The Frog		Collins & Harlan	
2977	La Paloma		Thomas Chalmers	
2978	I Lost My Heart In Honolulu		George Wilson Ballard	
2979	When Priscilla Tries to Reach High C		Jones & Murray	
2980				
2981	The Hospital Patients		Golden & Marlowe	
2982	I Left Her On A Beach In Honolulu		W. Van Brunt & Cho.	1916
2983				
2984	The Star Spangled Banner		Harry Humphrey & the Choir Boys of St. Ignatius Loyola	
2985	March Indienne		Creatore's Band	
2986	Arrah Go On, I'm Gonna Go Back To Oregon		Billy Murray	
2987	I'll Take You Home Again, Kathleen		Walter Van Brunt	
2988	Sunset On The St. Lawrence		Jaudas' Society Orc.	
2989	When That Little Yellow Fellow Plays Piano		Collins & Harlan	
2990	There's a garden in old Italy	McCarthy-Glogau	Irving kaufman	1916
2991	Good Bye, Good Luck, God Bless You		Rice & Van Brunt	
2992	The sundial	Darweski	Helen Clark	1916
2993	Dragon's Eye		Peerless Quartet	
2994	In dreamy Spain	Rizzi	Elizabeth spencer	1916
2995	San san soo	Lawrance; "Hip-Hip-Hooray"	George wilton Ballard	1916
2996	In A Dusty Caravan	Gilbert-Lee	Walter Van Brunt	
2997	There's a little baby up in the moon	David-godfrey-wright	Irving kaufman	1916
2998	Home, sweet home	Payne-bishop	Betsy Lane sheperd	1916
2999	I Sent My Wife To The Thousand Isles		Billy Murray	
3000	By The Sad Luana Shore – Step This Way		Elizabeth Spencer & George Wilton Ballard	
3001	I Surrender All		Metropolitan Quartet	
3002	Bantam Step – Fox Trot		Jaudas' Society Orchestra	
3003	Songs Of Other Days No.3		Metropolitan Mixed Chorus	
3004	Valse danseuse	Miles	William Dorn	1916
3005	Spring Band - Intermezzo		Sodero's Band	1916
3006	For Dixie And Uncle Sam		George Ballard	1916
3007	The Two-key rag	Hollander	Arthur Collins & Byron G. Harlan	1916
3008	The Boomerang March		New York Military Band	
3009	She is the sunshine of Virginia	Macdonald-Carroll	Walter van Brunt	1916
3010	He's The Makin's of A Darn'd Fine Man	Herman-Mahoney	Ada Jones	1916
3011	Smiles, Then Kisses – Waltz	Ancliffe	Waikiki Hawaiian Orchestra	1916
3012	I Was Never Near Heaven In My Life		Mayo & Tally	
3013	Ireland Must Be Heaven		Walter Van Brunt	
3014	You're A Dangerous Girl		Jaudas' Society Orc	
3015	On The South Sea Isle	Harry von Tilzer)	Helen Clark	
3016	Maria, Mari!	di Capua	thomas chalmers	1916
3017	I Never Knew - Canary Cottage		Gladys Rice & Walter Van Brunt	1916
3018	Battle Of The Marne		New York Military Band	1916
3019	Pretty Baby	Gus Kahn – Tony Jackson – Egbert Van Alstyne	Gladys Rice	1916
3020	For Killarney And You		Charles W. Harrison	1916
3021	Du Du, And Dr. Eisenbart		George Watson, yodle	
3022	Ben Bolt		Carolina Lazzari	
3023	The boomerang — One-step	Maurice	National Promenade Band	1916
3024	My Sweet Sweeting Waltz		Louise & Ferera, Hawaiian gtrs	
3025	In honeysuckle time	Marshall	Arthur Collins & Byron G. Harlan	1916
3026	Mighty Lak' A Rose		Jaudas' Society Orchestra	
3027	Turn Back the Universe and Give Me Yesterday		George Wilton Ballard	1916
3028	Annie Laurie		Criterion Quartet	
3029	Joy to the World		Carol Singers	
3030	The First Nowell		Carol Singers	
3031	O Sing To God		Shephard & Clark	
3032	Ring Out, Wild Bells		Carol Singers	
3033	In The Toymaker's Workshop		American Symphony Orchestra	1916
3034	Santa Claus Song, yodel	(Ellis)	George P. Watson	
3035	Christmas morning with the kiddies — Descriptive	Hager	Peerless orchestra	1916
3036	Christmas Eve		Robert Gayler, celeste	
3037	O'Brien is Tryin' To Learn To Talk Hawaiian		Ada Jones	
3038	There's a Little Bit of Bad in Every Good Little Girl	Grant Clarke – Fred Fisher	Gladys Rice	
3039	Poor Butterfly, from "The Big Show" New Yok Hippodrome		Elizabeth Spencer	
3040	It's Always Orange Day In California		Irving Kaufman	
3041	Mississippi Days		Collins & Harlan	
3042	In A Bird Store – Descriptive		American Sym Orc.	
3043	Listen to this — One-step	Kaufman	Juadas society orch. with N.A Sisty (banjo)	1916
3044	Songs of Other Days, No. 4		Metropolitan Mixed Chorus	
3045	Kamehameha March—Guitar Duet		Helen Louise & Frank Ferera	
3046	Dream		Hardy Williamson	
3047	La Confession Valse		Jaudas' Society Orc.	1917
3048	I'm A-Longin' Fo' You		Merle Alcock	
3049	Blue Eyes		C. Ballard	
3050	Old Virginny — One Step		Jaudas' Society Orch.	
3051	In Florida Among The Palms		Walter Van Brunt	
3052	New York Blues – Classical Rag		Pietro Frosini, acc.	
3053				
3054	Dancing Down in Dixieland		Collins and Harlan	
3055	The Whistler and His Dog		New York Military Band	
3056				
3057	You Wake Up In The Morning In Chicago		Billy Murray	
3058	Hilda		Ossman's Banjo Orc	
3059	Give Me All Of You from " Flora Bella"		Rice & Van Brunt	
3060				
3061	Childhood Days, from "The Girl From Brazil"		Gladys Rice	
3062	Come Back, Sweet Dreams, from "The Girl from Brazil"		Jaudas' Society Orchestra	
3063				
3064				
3065	Hawaiian Hula Melody		Helen Louise & Frank Ferreira, Hawaiian Gtrs	
3066	The Trial of Josiah Brown		Harlan Knight	
3067	Beneath A Balcony		Vess L. Ossman's Orchestra	1917
3068	Silver Star		Rice & Ballard	
3069	The Garden of Flowers		Walter Van Brunt	
3070	The Tales Of Hoffmann-Barcarole		American Symphony Orchestra	1917
3071	Shim-Me-Sha-Wabble		National Promenade Band	
3072	Eyes Have A Language of Their Own		Irving Kaufman	
3073	The Last Rose Of Summer & Old Folks At Home		M. Nagy, Zimbalon	
3074	Heart Of America March		N.Y. Military Band	1917
3075	After All		Charles Harrison	
3076	Flora Bella, From "Flora Bella"		Gladys Rice	
3077	A Wonderous Rose		Helen Clark	
3078				
3079	Sweet Genevieve		Ida Gardner	
3080	Just One Day		George Ballard	
3081	A Garden Dance		Imperial Marimba Band	
3082	Stradella Overture		Pietro Frosini, acc	
3083	Goldberg's Automobile Troubles		Dave Martin	
3084	A Broken Doll – London Taps		Jaudas' Society Orchestra	
3085	It's Not Your Nationality, It's Simply You		Billy Murray	
3086	How Could Washington Be A Married Man?		M. J. O'Connell	
3087	Honolulu, America Loves You		Arthur Fields	
3088	Go Get 'Em		Jaudas' Society Orchestra	
3089	Here Comes The Groom, from "Betty"		Billy Murray	
3090	When the Boys Come Home	John Hay – Oley Speaks	Frederick J. Wheeler	
3091	In Dear Old Napoli		Walter Van Brunt	
3092	Old Black Joe		The Criterion Quartet	1917
3093	The Chicken Walk – The Century Girl		L. Kaufman	
3094				
3095	There's a Little Bit of Bad In Every Good Little Girl		Jaudas' Society Orch.	
3096	In The Clock Store		Sodero's Band	
3097	Take This Letter to My Mother		Will Oakland	
3098	I'll Make You Want Me		Grant & Murry	
3099				
3100	When You Hear Jackson Moan On His Saxophone		Billy Murray	
3101	Oh! Frenchy!	Sam Ehrlich – Con Conrad	Arthur Fields	
3101	Ellis March		Ford Hawaiians	
3102	An Irish Folk-Song		Merle Alcock	
3103	Killarney		John Finnegan	
3104	The Messenger Boy March		Imperial Marimba Band	1917
3105				
3106	Good-Night Dinny, And God Bless You		George McFadden	
3107				
3108	Carnival Of Venice – Variations		Pietro Frosini, acc.	
3109	Medley of Scotch Airs		Fred Bacon, bjo.	
3110				
3111	Flora Bella – One Step		Jaudas' Society Orchestra	
3112	Don't Leave Me, Daddy		A. Fields	
3113	Way Down In Iowa		Billy Murray	
3114	Keep Your Eye On The Girlie You Love		Premier Quartet	
3115				
3116	Mammy's Little Coal Black Rose	Raymond Egan – Richard Whiting	Manuel Romain	
3117	Since Maggie Dooley Learned The Hooley-Hooley		Ada Jones	
3118	Mother, from "Her Soldier Boy"		George Ballard	1917
3119	Golden Sunshine-Her Soldier Boy		Betsy Lane Shepherd And George Wilton Ballard	1917
3120	Step With Pep		Jaudas' Society Orchestra.	
3121	What Do You Want To Make Those Eyes At Me For		Grant & Murray	
3122	Medley of Southern Airs		Fred Bacon, bjo	
3123	Put On Your Slippers and Fill Up Your Pipe		Ada Jones	
3124	With His Hands In His Pockets and His Pockets In His Pants		Byron G. Harlan	
3125	They're Wearing 'Em Higher in Hawaii	Joe Goodwin – Halsey K. Mohr	Premier Quartette	
3126	Erin is Calling		George Ballard	
3127				
3128	Who Will Care for Mother Now		W. Oakland	
3129	Kawaihau Waltz		Ford Hawaiians	
3130	When You And I Where Young, Maggie		Walter Van Brunt	
3131				
3132	Reminiscences Of Ireland		Sodero's Band	1917
3133	I Hear You Calling Me		Elizabeth Spencer	
3134	I'm Going Back To California		George Ballard	
3135	Don't Slam That Door		Ada Jones & Billy Murray	
3136	Blue Danube Waltz		Imperial Marimba Band	
3137	Naughty, Naughty, Naughty! from "Show of Wonders"		Gladys Rice	
3138	Dancing The Du Da Du Da Dea		Byron Harlan & Co	
3139	Pack Up Your Troubles in Your Old Kit Bag	George Asaf – Felix Powell	Helen Clark	
3140	That Funny Jas Band from Dixieland	Henry I. Marshal (music) and Gus Kahn (lyrics)	Arthur Collins & Byron G. Harlan	1916
3141	Waialae Medley Waltz		Waikiki Hawaiian Orchestra	
3142	American Eagle March		New York Military Band	
3143	How's Every Little Thing In Dixie		Premier Quartet	
3144				
3145	Angels, Roll The Rock Away – Easter Hymn		Calvary Choir	
3146	Poor Butterfly		Jaudas' Band	
3147	Little By Little & Bit By Bit, from "Go To It"		Billy Murray	
3148	Songs of Other Days, No 5		Metropolitan Mixed Chorus	
3149	Aloha Oe		Ford Hawaiians	
3150	One Kiss And All is O'er		George Wilton Ballard	
3151	Marie, My Own Marie		Gladys Rice	
3152	The Band Festival At Plum Center		Jones, Porter & Harlan	
3153	One, Two, Three, Four Medley		Waikiki Hawaiian Orchestra	
3154	Sari Waltz		Imperial Marimba Band	
3155	Caprice Viennois		G. H. Green, xyl.	
3156	Santa Lucia		Ferando Guaaneri	
3157	The Story Of Chicken Little		Edna Bailey	
3158	The Coon Waiters		Billy Golden & James Marlowe	
3159	In the Sweet Long Ago		George Wilton Ballard	
3160	Shall We Gather At The River?		Metropolitan Quartet	
3161	A Ragtime Drama		Jones & Murray	
3162	Flona Bella Waltzes		Jaudas' Society Band	
3163	Rolling Stones		Arthur Fields	
3164	Loin Du Bal		Creator & His Band	
3165	Marche aux Flambeaux – Organ Solo	Scotson Clark	Albert Ketelbey	
3165	The Hot Dog's Fancy Ball		M. J. O'Connell	
3166	Cross My Heart (And Hope To Die)		Ada Jones	
3167	A Beautiful Day – Waltz		Jaudas' Society Orc	
3168	Sons of Australia march	lithgow	Sodero's Band	1917
3169	From Here To Shanghai		Collins and Haran	1917
3170	Why Don't You Come Back Home Again		Manuel Romain	
3171	Whispering Flowers	Blon	Reed Orc	
3172	In the gloaming	Harrison	Betsy Lane Shepherd	1916
3173	Tho' I'm Not The First To Call You Sweetheart		George Ballard	
3174	Have-A-Heart Waltz		Jaudas' Society Orchestra	
3175	Songs of Other Days, No. 6		Metropolitan Mixed Chorus	1916
3176	Napoleon	kern	billy Murray and chorus	1917
3177	Marche Lorraine	ganne	Creatore & his Band	1916
3178	One Fleeting Hour	Lee	Gladys Rice	1916
3179	I'm So Busy, from "Have A Heart"		Grant & Murry	
3280	Aloha Sunset Land		Waikiki Hawaiian Orchestra	
3181	Kaena		Henry Kailimai & Ford Hawaiians	1917
3182				
3183	Brighten The Corner Where You Are		Apollo Quartet of Boston	
3184	In The Garden		Apollo Quartet of Boston	
3185	Can't Yo' Heah Me Callin', Caroline		Vernon Dalhart	
3186	Money Blues- Fox Trot		Jaudas' Band	1917
3187	Have A Heart		Jaudas' Band	1917
3188	Buzzin' The Bee		Collins & Harlan	
3189	A Broken Doll		Manuel Romain	
3190	Come On Over Here, It's A Wonderful Place		Ada Jones	
3191	King Cotton March		New York Military Band	
3192	Where The Black-Eyed Susans Grow		Adolph Hahl	
3193	A Walk In The Forest		Alessios-De Filippis Mandolin Orchestra	1917
3194	Come Out Of The Kitchen, Mary Ann		Ada Jones	
3195	Allah's Holiday, from "Katinka"		Judas' Society Orc	
3196	Night Time in Little Italy		Collin & Harlan	
3197	Everybody Loves a "Jass" Band	Leon Flatow	Arthur Fields	
3198	Home Again-One Step		Jaudas' Band	
3199	Honor Thy Mother And Father		Manuel Romain	
3200	The Valley Of Love		Ansonia Instrumental Quartet	
3201	Let's All Be Americans Now		Adolph Hahl	
3202	The Stars And Strips Forever March		Imperial Marimba Band	
3203	Melody of American Patriotic Airs		New York Military Band	
3204	Silver Bay		Metropolitan Quartet	
3205	'Twas Only An Irishman's Dream		George Wilton Ballard	
3206	Silver Threads Among The Gold	Rexford-Danks	M. Nagy, zimbalon	1916
3207	Would You Take Back The Love You Gave Me		Emory Randolph	
3208	Dreams		Carolina Lazzari	
3209	Vera — Valse lente	lithgow	Sodero's Band	1917
3210	Faust Waltz (Not marked Thomas A. Edison, Pat July 29, '02)		Orchestra	
3211	She's Dixie All The Time		Premier Qrt	
3212	Rolling Stones Waltz		Jaudas' Society Orc	
3213	Hill And Dale		Van Eps' Banjo Orc	1917
3214	American War Songs No.1		American Brass Band	
3215	American War Songs, No 2		American Brass Qrt.	
3216	It's A Long, Long Time Since I've Been Home		Billy Murray	
3217	I've Got The Sweetest Girl In Maryland		Premier Qrt.	1917
3218	Uncle Sam Medley, No 1		National Guard Fife & Drum Corps	
3219	Uncle Sam Medley, No. 2		National Guard Fife & Drum Corps	
3220	The Liberty Bell March	John Philip Sousa	N.Y. Military Band	1917
3221	The American Patrol		New York Military Band	
3222	For Me and My Gal	Edgar Leslie – E. Ray Goetz – George W. Meyer	Billy Murray	
3223	Hawaiian Butterfly Melody - Fox Trot		Jaudas' Society Orchestra	
3224	Gentle Spring Very short section!		Murray & Belmont	
3225	Scatter Seeds Of Kindness		Metropolitan Qrt.	
3226	Kiss Me Again Waltz		Waikiki Hawaiian Orch.	
3226	Why I love Him		Robert Clark	
3227	My Waikiki Mermaid – Hula Medley		Waikiki Hawaiian Orchestra	
3228	The "Jass" One Step		Jaudas' Society Orc	
3229	Hawaiian Butterfly		Stewart Jackson	
3230	Henry And Hank in Vaudeville		Kaufman Brothers	
3231	Cora		Vernon Dalhart	
3232				
3233	The Boy Scouts of America March		New York Military Band	
3234	The Cute Little Wigglin' Dance		Collins & Harlan	
3235	Mo-Ana – Hawaiian Waltz		Jaudas' Society Orchestra	
3236	Daly's Reel		Van Eps' Banjo Orch.	1917
3237	On Johnny, Oh Johnny, Oh		Premier Qrt.	
3238	Hong Kong		Arthur Fields	
3239	America, Here's My Boy		George Ballard	
3240	I'm A Poor Married Man		Billy Murray	
3241	Canary Cottage – One Step		Fresco "Jazz" Band	
3242	Poor Butterfly		Armand Vecsey & his Hungarian Orchestra	
3243	It's Time For Every Boy To Be A Soldier		Gladys Rice	
3244	There's Egypt In Your Dreamy Eyes		Vernon Dalhart	
3245	The Man Behind The Hammer And The Plow		Arthur Fields	
3246	On The Party Line		Billy Murray	
3247	Oh Boy!		Jaudas' Society Orchestra	
3248	All Hail The Power Of Jesus Name		Metropolitan Qrt	
3249	Indiana		Homestead Trio	
3250				
3251	He's Living The Life of Reilly		Edward Meeker	
3252	What Kind of American Are You?		Helen Clark	
3253				
3254	Johnson "Jass" Blues		Frisco "Jass" Band	
3255	A Darkey's Oration On Women		Golden & Marlowe	
3256	Oh Johnny! Oh Johnny! - One Step		Jaudas' Society Orc.	
3257	Oh What Wonderful Things One Little Girl Can Do		Arthur Fields	
3258	The Road That Leads To Love		Manuel Roman	
3259	The Sunshine Of Your Smile		Jaudas' Society Orchestra	
3260	Where Do We Go From Here?		Arthur Fields	
3261	Sweet Peggy Magee		Jones & Spencer	
3262	Hail to The Spirit Of Liberty		New York Military Band	
3263	Our Own Make – Polka		Jules Levy, Jr. cnt	
3265	Down In Lily Land		Coxx Young	
3266				
3267	Hawaiian Dreams		Waikiki Hawaiian Orchestra	
3268				
3269	Wiliwili Wai		Ford Hawaiians	
3270	I Dreamt I Dwelt In Marble Halls & The Heart Bowed Down		Venetian Instrumental Qrt	
3271	The Invincible Eagle March		N.Y. Military Band	1917
3272				
3273	Kathleen Mavourneen		M. Nagy, zimbalom	
3274	Myona -- Hawaiian Waltz		Waikiki Hawaiian Orc.	
3275	Over There	George M. Cohan	Billy Murray	
3276				
3277	Blest Be The Tie That Binds		Metropolitan Quartet	
3278	Molly Dear – Waltz		Jaudas' Society Orc.	
3279	Fashion plate march	English	New York Military band	1917
3280	Hungarian Lustspiel Overture	Keler-Bela	George Hamilton Green (xylophone)	1917
3281	The girl you can't forget	Williams	Manuel Romain	1917
3282	Voci di primavera	Strauss, op. 410	Armand Vecsey & his Hungarian Orchestr	1917
3283	Armand Vecsey & his Hungarian Orchestra	Ackley	Robert E. Clark (This is Clark's first Edison recording.)	1917
3284	Dear Old Fashioned Songs My Mother Sang To Me		George McFadden	1917
3285	Akahi Hoi		Ford Hawaiians	
3286	Night Time In Little Italy		Frisco "Jass" Band	1917
3287	When The Bonnie, Bonnie Heather is Blooming		Glen Ellison	
3288	Under The Stars		Walter Van Brunt	
3289	Gentle Annie		Apollo Quartet of Boston	
3290	All The World Will Be Jealous Of Me		Irving Kaufman	
3291	Hello, My Dearie – One-Step		Jaudas' Society Orc.	
3292	Buzzin' The Bee		Lou Chiha "Frisco", xyl.	
3293	Everybody Loves A Big Brass Band		Edward Meeker	
3294	I called you my sweetheart	Monaco	George Wilton Ballard	1917
3295	Nesting Time		Grant & Murray	
3296	For The Freedom Of The world		Jaudas' Society Orc.	
3297	Are You Coming Back To Dixieland?		Rice & Dalhart	
3298	Havanola		Jaudas' Band	
3299	You May Hold A Million Girlies In Your Arms		Arthur Fields	
3300	You said something	Kern; "Have a Heart"	Gladys Rice (as Rachael Grant) & Billy Murray	1917
3301	That Creepy, Weepy Feeling. His Little Widows		Gladys Rice, Marion Evelyn Cox, George Wilton Ballard, and Harvey Hindermeyer	
3302	Felicia Waltz		Judas' Society Orchestra	
3303	Pozzo — Fox trot	Rose	Frisco Jazz Band	1917
3304	Some Sweet Day Bye and Bye		Metropolitan Quartet	
3305	Do you sometimes think of me?	MacMeekin	Marion Evelyn Cox & John Young	1917
3306	It's Nice To Get Up In The Mornin'		G. Ellison	
3307	The Low-Back'd Car		Walter Van Brunt	
3308	As We Part		Gladys Rice	
3309	Aida – Selection No 1		Creatore & his Band	
3310	Aida-Selection No 2		Creatore's Band	
3311	Loch Lomond		Marie Morrisey	
3312	Sing! Sing! Birds On The Wing		Master Claude Isaacs	
3313	That creepy, weepy feeling — One-step	Schroeder; "His Little Widow	Jaudas' Society Orchestra	1917
3314	The Drytown Blues		Lou Chiha "Frisco", xyl	
3315	When I Dream Of Old Erin		Apollo Quartet Of Boston	
3316	From Me to Mandy Lee		Premier Quartette	
3317	Bill's Visit to St. Peter		Golden & Heins	
3318	Wonderful Girl, Good Night		Grant & Murray	
3319	I May Be Gone For A Long, Long Time		Shannon Qrt.	
3320	Aren't You Coming Back To Dixieland- Fox Trot		Jaudas' Society Orc.	
3321	Goodbye Broadway, Hello France	C. Francis Reisner – Benny Davis – Billy Baskette	Arthur Fields	
3322	Huckleberry Finn		Premier Quartet	
3323	Joan of Arc, They Are Calling You		Vernon Dalhart	
3324	Send Me Away with a Smile	Louis Weslyn – Al Piantadosi	Arthur Fields	
3325	Invincible America March		New York Military Band	
3326	Good Luck and God Be With You, Laddie Boy	Will D. Cobb – Gus Edwards	Lawrence E. Gilbert	
3327	Chu Chin Chow		Marion Cox	
3328	When Johnny Marches Away		New York Military Band	
3329	Bill's Dog Towser		Golden & Heins	
3330	Christmas Memories		Robert Gayler, celeste.	
3331	U.S. Army Bugle Calls, No. 1		S. W. Smith & Bugle Squad	
3332	U.S. Army Bugle Calls, No. 2		S.W. Smith, USN, & Bugle Squad	
3333	Star Of Bethlehem		Vernon Dalhart	
3334	If You Had All The World And Its Gold		Manuel Romain	
3335	Mammy Blossom's 'Possum Party		Collins & Harlan	
3336	Wilhelmina waltzes	Hall	American Symphony Orchestra	1917
3337	Yah-De-Dah - Fox Trot	KAUFMAN	Frisco "Jass Band	
3338	Spring, beautiful spring — Waltzes	Lincke	Peerless Orchestra	1917
3339	Hitchy-Koo		Jaudas' Society Orchestra	1917
3340	Mother, Dixie And You		Arthur Fields	
3341	The Kiss Waltz- Her Soldier Boy		Jaudas' Society Orchestra	1914
3342	Put The Cork Out Of Erin		Irving Kaufman	
3343	Wee Deoch and Dora		Glen Ellison	
3344	March Of The Toys		American Sym Orc.	
3345	Joy To The World, Our Lord is Born Today		Metropolitan Qrt.	
3346	God Rest Ye Merry Gentlemen		Carol Singers	
3347	Old Jim's Christmas Hymn		Edward Allen	
3348	The Birthday Of A King		Pietro Capodiferro, cnt	
3349	We three kings of Orient are	Hopkins	Carol Singers	1917
3350	Whose Little Heart Are You Breaking Now?		Grace Woods & Arthur Fields	
3351	Some Sunday Morning		Jones & Murray	
3352	Pull the Cork Out of Erin		Irving Kaufman	
3353	Call Again, Mr. Calligan		George McFadden	
3354	Lily of the Valley		Jones & Murray	
3355	Ole Virginny Days		Homestead Trio	
3356	Honest Injun		Lou Chiha "Frisco", xyl.	
3357	Goodbye, Good Luck, God Bless You – Medley Waltz		Jaudas' Society Orchestra	1917
3358	The Spirit Of America- A Patriotic Patrol		New York Military Band	
3359	Forever is a Long, Long Time		Gladys Rice	
3360	The Peacock Strut-Fox Trot (XYLO)		Lou Chiha "Frisco"	
3361	Medley of Irish Jigs		Pat Scanlon, acc.	
3362	It's a Long Way Back to Mother's Knee		G. Ballard	
3363	Good Bye Broadway, Hello France	C. Francis Reisner – Benny Davis – Billy Baskette	Jaudas' Society Orch.	
3364	Cute Little Wigglin' Dance		Frisco Jazz Band	
3365	Long Boy – Rube War Song		Steve Porter	
3366	The Sea Makes A Man A Man		Donald Chalmers	
3367	We're Going Over		Premier quartet	
3368	It's A Long Way to Berlin, But We'll Get There		A. Fields	1917
3369	Cheer Up, Liza – Fox Trot		Jaudas' Society Orc	
3370	Melody land	Hubbell; "Cheer Up	Thomas Chalmers (as Lawrence E. Gilbert)	1917
3371	That's why my heart is calling you	Motzan	Vernon Dalhart	1918
3372	Royal Italian March		New York Military Band	
3373	I'll Remember You, Love, In My Prayers		Betsy Shepherd	
3374	There It Goes Again		Billy Murray	
3375	Hail, Hail, The Gang's All Here		Shannon Qrt	
3376	II Convegno-Divertimento		Anthony Giammatteo & Fred J. Brissett, clas	
3377				
3378	I Don't Want To Get Well		Arthur Fields	
3379				
3380	Wake Up, Virginia And Prepare For Your Wedding Day		Shannon Qrt	
3381	I'd Feel At Home If They Would Let Me Join The Army		M.J. O'Connell	
3382				
3383	Where The Sunset Turns The Ocean's Blue To Gold		George Ballard	
3384	Comin' Thro' The Rye		Claude Isaacs	
3385	The Nightingale's Song from "Pinafore"		Vernon Dalhart	
3386				
3387	Naval Reserve March		New York Military Band	
3388	Sweet Emalina, My Gal		Vernon Dalhart	
3389				
3390	All I Need Is A Girl Just Like You		Frisco Jazz Band	
3391	Bungalow In Quogue, from "The Riviera Girl"		Rachael Grant & Billy Murry	1918
3392	When The Lights Are Low		Helen Clark	
3393	Valse Llewellyn	Rudy Wiedoeft	Rudy Wiedoeft	
3394	Is It Nothing To You?		Betsy Shepherd	
3395	Ballet Egyptian, No. 1 & 2		American Symphony Orc.	
3396	Two Roses		Carolina Lazzari	
3397	Musical Sam From Alabam'		Premier Qrt.	
3398	So Long, Mother		George Ballard	
3399	I'm All Bound Round with the Mason–Dixon line	Sam M. Lewis – Joe Young – Jean Schwartz	Vernon Dalhart	
3400				
3401	My Hawaii, You're Calling Me		Gladys Rice & Vernon Dalhart	
3402	Camp Songs Of The US Army, No. 1		Chorus Of Male Voices	
3403	Camp Songs of the US Army, No. 2		Male Chorus	
3404	More Candy - One Step		Jaudas' Society Qrt.	
3405	Ballet -- Egyptian, No. 3		American Symphony Orc.	
3406	Knit, Knit, Knit		Rice, Clark & Cox	
3407	The Best Things In Life Are Free		George Ballard	
3408				
3409	Love, Here Is My Heart		Herbert Soman, vin	
3410	Offertoire		Weyert A. Moor, flute	
3411	All I Need is Just a Girl Like You	Addison Burkhardt – Abe Olman	Rachael Grant & Billy Murray	1918
3412	Dixieland Memories No. 1		Orpheus Male Choir	
3413	Dixieland Memories No 2		Orpheus Male Choir	
3414	Impassioned Dream Waltz		Peerless Orc.	
3415	Love's Message		Sodero's Band	1918
3416	Hy-Sine - One Step		Jaudas' Society Orc.	
3417	Medley of Irish Reels		Pat Scanlon, acc	
3418	That's It! - Fox Trot		Frisco "Jass" Band	
3419	Jack-O-Lantern		Jaudas' Society Orc	
3420	Ma Bella Charmante – Concert Waltz		Peerless Orc	
3421	Saxophone Sobs		Rudy Wiedoeft, sax	
3422	Suki San (where the cherry blossoms fall)	Donaldson	Vernon Dalhart	1918
3423	For You And Tennessee		Harmony Four	
3424	When You Hear That Raggy Refrain		Billy Murray w/Chorus	
3425	Lullaby		Helen Clark	
3426	They Go Wild, Simply Wild Over Me	Joseph McCarthy (lyricist) – Fred Fisher	Billy Murray (singer)	
3427	Laughing song	Johnson	Edward Meeker & Empire Vaudeville Co.	1918
3428	Somewhere In France Is The Lily		Edward Allen	
3429	Victory – Easter Carol		Carol Singers	
3430	Tho' I Had a Bit o' The Devil In Me		George McFadden	
3431	Favorite Hymns of Fanny Crosby, No 1		Calvary Choir	
3432	The Nightingale And The Frog		Moor & Kohon, pic & bassoon	
3433	Are You From Heaven		Vernon Dalhart	
3434	Blackthorn Stick Medley Of Jigs		Charles D'Almaine	1918
3435	Katy Mahone		Shannon Quartet	
3436	Break The News To Mother	Harris	George Ballard	1918
3437	Till We Meet Again (Not marked Thomas A. Edison, Pat July 29, '02)		Band	
3438	Shepard, Show Me How To Go		Navada Van Der Veer	
3439	Garden of love — Caprice	Ascher-Mahl	Peerless Orchestra	1918
3440	The Garden Of Allah		Vernon Dalhart	
3441	Life's Railway To Heaven		Allen & Hart	
3442	Rambling Rose – One-Step		Jaudas' Society Orchestra	
3443	I'm Sorry I made You Cry		Burr	
3443	We Want The Flowers Now		V. Dalhart & L. Gilbert	1918
3444	When I Hear that Jazz Band Play – Fox Trot		Jaudas' Society Orch.	
3445	My Sunshine Jane		Manuel Romain	
3446	Kohala March – Instrumental Trio		Ford Hawaiians	
3447	When Yankee Doodle Learns to "Parlez Vous Français"	Ed Nelson – Will Hart	Fields	
3448				
3449	The Glow Worm		Imperial Marimba Band	
3450	Smiles		Burr	
3450	Wasatch - Fox Trot		Jaudas' Band	1918
3451	Silver Threads Among the Gold		Eliz.' Spencer & Cho.	
3452	Just As Your Mother Was		Harmony Four	
3453	Daddy, I Want To Go		Premier Qrt	
3454	Hush-A-Bye, Ma Baby – The Missouri Waltz		Marion Cox & Vernon Dalhart	
3455	Longing For My Dixie Home		Harvey Hindermeyer	
3456				
3457	The Laddie In Khaki		Glen Ellison	
3458	A Dream Picture From "Uncle Tom's Cabin"		Edison Concert Band	
3459				
3460	The Battle Song Of Liberty March		New York Military Band	
3461	Old Timer's Waltz		Jaudas' Society Orc.	
3462	The Darktown Strutters Ball – Fox Trot		Jaudas' Society Orc.	
3463	Tell Mother I'll Be There		Burr.	
3463	Li'l Lisa Jane		Jaudas' Society Orchestra	1918
3464	The Elephant and the Fly		Moor & Kohon	
3465	On The Banks Of The Brandywine		W. Van Brunt	1918
3466	The Whistling Coon		Meeker & Empire Vauderville Co.	
3467	Work, For The Night Is Coming & Jesus, Saviour, Pilot Me		Metropolitan Qrt.	
3468	A Little Love, A Little Kiss		Ralph Errolle	
3469	The Magic Of Your Eyes		G. Ballard	1918
3470	Nobody Knows The Trouble I See		Vernon Dalhart	
3471	American Aviation March		Creatore & His Band	
3472				
3473	Says I To Myself, Says I		Ada Jones	
3474	Going Up – The Tickle Toe		Vernon Dalhart	
3474A	Chong. (Fox Trot) (Not marked Thomas A. Edison, Pat July 29, '02)		Van Eps Banjo	
3475	There's A Wideness In Gods Mercy		May Wright	
3475	How Ya Gonna Keep 'Em Etc.		Van Eps Banjo Orchestra	
3476	The Darktown Strutters Ball		Premier Quartet	1918
3477	I'm Going To Follow The Boys		Grant & Murray	
3478	Everyone's Crazy 'Bout The Doggone Blues		Collins and Harlan	
3478A	I'm Forever Blowing Bubbles (Not marked Thomas A. Edison, Pat July 29, '02)		Orchestra	
3479	The Dixie Volunteers		Premier Qrt.	
3480	'Round Her Neck She Wears A Yeller Ribbon		Byron Harlan & Chorus	
3481	Wisconsin Forward For Ever March		New York Military Band	
3482	Watermelon Whispers		George Hamilton Green, xyl.	
3483	I'll Take You Back To Italy		Ada Jones & Billy Murray	
3484	My Irish Song Of Songs (Once Upon A Time)		W. Oakland	1918
3485	Umbrellas To Mend-One Step		Frisco "Jass" Band	
3486	Old Dog Tray		Walter Van Brunt	
3487	Safe in the Arms of Jesus		The Calvary Choir	
3488	Farmyard Medley		Premier Quartet	
3489	Paddle-Addle		Jaudas Society Orchestra	1923
3490	Hands Across The Sea March		New York Military Band	1918
3491	Indianola		New York Military Band	
3492	The Nation's Awakening March		New York Military Band	
3493	Kimmel March		John K. Kimmel acc.	
3494				
3495				
3496	Each Stich Is A Thought Of You		Helen Clark & the Criterion Qrt.	
3497	A Submarine Attack		Premier Quartet & Co.	
3498	K-K-K-Katy		Billy Murray & Chorus	
3499	The Tickle Toe		The Tickle Toe	

== Edison Blue Amberols 3500–4499 ==
Issue number	Title	Writer(s)	Performer(s)	Date
3500	The Daughter of Rosie O'Grady	(w. Monty C. Brice m. Walter Donaldson)	Ada Jones	1918
3501	I Miss That Mississippi MissThat Misses Me	Wendling	Arthur Collins and Byron G. Harlan	
3502	I'm Sorry I Made You Cry		George Ballard	
3503	When The Ships Come Home, from "Oh Lady! Lady!		Helen Clark & Girl Chorus	
3504	Just a Baby's Prayer at Twilight	(w. Sam M. Lewis & Joe Young m. M.K. Jerome)	Homestead Trio	
3505	A Little Bit Of Sunshine From Home		Vernon Dalhart	
3506	The Makin's Of The USA		Billy Murray	
3507	Send Me A Curl		Premier Quartet	
3508				
3509				
3510	Rag-A-Minor		Jazzarimba Orchestra	
3511	I'm Just A Ragged Newsboy		Walter Van Brunt	
3512	The Volunteers March		New York Military Band	
3513	The Last Long Mile - Too Toot		Billy Murray w/Chorus	
3514	Oh! Mi!		Edward Meeker	
3515				
3516	On the Road to Home Sweet Home	(w. Gus Kahn m. Egbert Van Alstyne)	John Young & George w. Reardon	
3517	Lorraine		Vernon Dalhart	
3518	Three Pickaninnies		Collins & Harlan	
3519	I'll Come Back To You When It's All Over		Edward Allen	
3520				
3521	Connaught Man – Medley of Jigs		John J. Kimmel, acc	
3522	He Lifted Me		Metropolitan Quartet	
3523	Roamin' in the Gloamin'		G. Ellison	
3524	Three Wonderful Letters From Home		George Ballard	
3525	We Stopped Them At The Marne		Premier Qrt	
3526	Kiss Me Again – Waltz		Waikiki Hawaiian Orc	
3527	When You Feel A Little Longing, Etc.		Gladys Rice & V. Dalhart	1918
3528	Just Like Washington Crossed the Delaware, General Pershing Will Cross the Rhine Just Like Washington Crossed the Delaware	George W. Meyer w. Howard Johnson	Arthur Fields	
3529	Chimes of Normandy	wells	Helen Clark	1918
3530	Creator's Bad March		Creatore & his Band	
3531	That Grand Old Gentleman, Uncle Sam		A. Fields & Cho.	
3532	I'll Think Of You		Rice & Dalhart	
3533	The Rainbow Girl		Jazzarimba Orc	
3534	Come Along, Ma Honey		Helen Clark	
3535	The Sunshine of Your Smile		Vernon Dalhart	
3536	La Gioconda: Dance of the hours — Part 1	ponchielli	American symphony orchestra	1918
3537	La Gioconda: Dance of the hours — Part 2	Ponchielli	American symphony orchestra	1918
3538	By an' by	Traditional; arr. Burleigh	Reed miller	1918
3539	Selection from "The Bohemian Girl"		Creatore & his Band	
3540	Day by day the manna fell — Christian Science hymn	Gottschalk	Nevada van der Veer	1918
3541	Trumpeter's Carnival March		New York Military Band	
3542	Derby Day In Dixie		Elaine Gordon	
3543	Put Me in My Little Bed		Gladys Rice & Chorus	
3544	Has Anyone Seen My Corinne?		Vernon Dalhart	
3545	Bye And Bye		Jones & Murray	
3546	The Colored Recruits		Golden & Heins	
3547	Ben Bolt & In The Gloaming		Bohumir Kryl	
3548	Homeward Bound		George Ballard	
3549	Bring Me a Letter from My Old Home Town		R. Jones	
3550	Camouflage - One Step		New York Military Band	
3551	We'll Do Our Share		Harmony Four	
3552	Texas — Fox trot	Guion	Jaudas society orchestra	1918
3553	When Alexander Takes His Ragtime Band To France		Arthur Fields	
3554	Jazbo Jazz		Earl Fuller's Jazz Band	
3555	Daddy Mine		Helen Clark	
3556	Poet & Peasant Overture, Pt 1		Creator & His Band	
3557	Poet & Peasant Overture, Part 2		American Symphony Orchestra	
3558	Piccolo Pic		Creatore & His Band	
3559	Good And Bad		Golden & Heins	
3560	Alice, I'm In Wonderland		Vernon Dalhart	
3561	The Sweetest Story Ever Told		Ralph Errolle	1919
3562	Little Good For Nothing's Good For Something After All		Harmony Four	
3563	Clover Club		Imperial Marimba Band	
3564	Any Old Place The Gang Goes		Edward Meeker	
3565	Poet and Peasant Overture - part 1	Suppé	American symphony orchestra	1918
3566	Maytime-Waltz		Jazzarimba Orc	
3567	Blue Rose Waltz		Jaudas' Society Orc.	
3568	We're All Going Calling On The Kaiser		Arthur Fields & Chorus	
3569	When I Send You A Picture Of Berlin		Billy Murray	
3570	Hearts Of The World		Edward Allen	
3571	Indianola		Billy Murray	
3572	Jazzin' Around - One Step		Fuller's Famous Jazz Band	
3573	The Little Old Log Cabin In The Lane		Metropolitan Qrt	
3574	Go Down, Moses		Reed Miller	
3575	Somewhere In Hawaii		Waikiki Hawaiian Orchestra	
3576	Down In Jungle Land		Collins & Harlan	
3577	Bonnie Kate — Medley of reels	traditional	John J. Kimmel	1918
3578	Second Mazurka (Godard)		Andre Benoist, pno.	
3579	There Are Tears In Your Dear, Dear Eyes		Helen Clark	
3580	Boccaccio — Selection	Suppé	Creatore and his band	1918
3581	Mignon Fantasia Pt. 1		American Symphony Orchestra	1918
3582	Mignon— Selection (No. 2)	Thomas	American symphony orchestra	1918
3583	Aloma Land		Waikiki Hawaiian Band	
3584	Molly O — Medley waltz	Olcott	Jaudas' Society Orchestra	1918
3585	I'm Sorry I Made You Cry – Jazz Fox Trot		Earl Fuller's Famous Jazz Band	
3586				
3587	Everything's Funny To Me (Laughing Song)		Sallie Stembler	
3588	Sliding Sid		New York Military Band	
3589	Nona Waltz		Imperial Marimba Band	
3590	My Old Shako		Peter Dawson	
3591	The Land Where the Roses Never Fade		R. Clark	
3592	Sabre And Spurs March		N. Y. Military Band	1918
3593	If he can fight like he can love, goodnight Germany!		Elaine Gordon	
3594				
3595	Hello Central, Give Me No-Man's Land		Billy Murray	
3596	Oui, Oui, Marie		Grant & Murray	
3597	When You Come Back		Premier Quartet	
3598	Mammy's Chocolate Soldier		Harmony Four	
3599	In The Land O' Yamo Yamo		Billy Murray	
3600	Little Tommy Went A-Fishing		Criterion Quartet	
3601	Oh! Frenchy		Arthur Fields	
3602	Uncle Sammy -- Vocal March		Premier Quartet	
3603	General Pershing March		Imperial Marimba Band	
3604				
3605	Whenever I think of You		Betsy Shepherd	
3606	Sweet Hawaiian Moonlight		Rice & Cox	
3607	The Most Beautiful Picture Of All		Manuel Raman	1918
3608	When I Send A Picture of Berlin - One Step		Jaudas' Society Orchestra	
3609				
3610	Jazz De Luxe		Earl Fuller's Famous Jazz Band	
3611				
3612	Good-Bye Alexander	(w. m. Henry Creamer & Turner Layton)	Ada Jones	1918
3613	Smiles		Harmony Four	
3614	Watch The Bee Go Get The Hun		Edward Meeker	
3615	Smiles		Jaudas' Society Orchestra	
3616	Hawaiian Breezes		Waikiki Hawaiian Orchestra	
3617	Everything is Peaches Down in Georgia	(w. Grant Clarke m. Milton Ager)	Collins & Harlan	
3618	The Battle In The Air		Premier Qrt	
3619	Ambrose And Steve In Court		Golden & Heins	
3620	The Night, My Love And I		Vernon Dalhart	
3621	The Song Of Ages – Christmas Song		Metropolitan Quartet	
3622	Oriental – Fox Trot		Jaudas' Society Orchestra	
3623	I'm Waiting For You Liza Jane		Collins & Harlan	
3624	Just Blue – Fox Trot		All Star Trio	
3625	When I Get Out In No Man's Land		Arthur Collins	
3626				
3627	Yock-A-Hilo Town		Vernon Dalhart	
3628				
3629	Barcarolle, from "The Tales of Hoffman"		Creatore & His Band	
3630	If I'm Not At The Roll-Call		Harvey Wilson	
3631	God Be With Our Boys To-night		Metropolitan Quartet	1919
3632	Soldier Songs, No 1		Male Voices	
3633	Just A Baby's Prayer At Twilight		Herbert Soman, vin:	
3634	Mandy-Yip-Yip-Yaphank		Billy Murray	
3635	When I Gets Out In No-Mans Land		Arthur Collins	
3636	The Y.M.C.A. From "Yi-Yi-Yaphank"		George Ballard	
3637	When Shadows Fall		Waltzin' B. Blix	
3638	Soldier's Songs		Male Voices	
3639	Oh! How I Hate to Get Up in the Morning		A. Fields	
3640	Everything Is Hunky Dory Down In Hunky Dory Town from " Everything", NY Hippodrome		Collins & Harlan	
3641	Tell That To The Marines		Billy Murray	
3642	I Ain't Got Weary Yet		Arthur Fields	
3643	Keep The Home Fires Burning		Homestead Trio	
3644	Dear Spirit, Lead Thou Me		Metropolitan Qrt	
3645	Hindustan		All Star Trio	
3646	I'm Always Chasing Rainbows, from "Oh Look"		Harvey Wilson	
3647				
3648	Concerto No. 2 in D Minor-Andante (Goltermann)		Willem Willeke, vic	
3649	Ja-Da	(w.m. Bob Carleton)	Arthur Fields	
3650	The Girl Behind The Gun		Jaudas' Society Orc	
3651	Sweet 'N Pretty		Collins & Harlan	
3652	Creole Belles & Soldiers In The Park March		New York Military Band	
3653				
3654	The Wee Hoose 'Mang The Heather		Glen Ellison	1919
3655	I'm Sorry I Made You Cry		Herbert Soman, vin	
3656	Hawaiian Nights – Waltz		Waikiki Hawaiian Orchestra	
3657				
3658	A Little Birch Canoe And You		Manuel Romain	
3659	You'll Find Old Dixieland In France		Arthur Fields	
3660	Out Of The East-Oriental Fox Trot		Jaudas' Society Orc	
3661				
3662	I Want A Doll		Billy Murray	
3663	The Irish Washerwoman Medley of Jigs		Violin Solo Harold Veo Piano Accompaniment by John F. Burckhardt	
3664	Hawaiian Nights Waltz		Waikiki Hawaiian Orchestra	
3665	Reilly's Reel		Harold Veo. vin	
3666	After You've Gone	(w. Henry Creamer m. Turner Layton)	Rachael Grant & Billy Murray	
3667	Arabian Nights	One-Step	The All Star Trio	
3668	Clancy's Wooden Wedding		Edward Meeker	
3669				
3670	Till We Meet Again		Gladys Rice & Vernon Dalhart	
3671	DJER -- Kiss Waltz		Jaudas Society Orch	
3672	Miss Trombone		New York Military Band	
3673	The Worst Is Yet To Come		Billy Murray with Chorus	
3674				
3675	When You Look in the Heart of a Rose	(w. Marion Gillespie m. Florence Methuen)	Edward Allen	
3676	Some Day Waiting Will End		Leola Lucey	
3677	Rose of No Man's Land	(w. Jack Caddingan m. Joseph A. Brennan)	Moonlight Trio	
3678	Bring Back The Rose		Will Oakland	
3679	Mother - And Me		George Wilton Ballard	1915
3680				
3681	It's Never Too Late To Be Sorry		Manuel Romain	
3682	Mollie Darling		Charles Hart	
3683	The Passion Dance		PEERLESS Orc	
3684	A Dusky Lullaby		The Homestead Trio	1919
3685				
3686	Zampa Overture, Pt 2		American Symphony Orchestra	
3687	La Chanson Des Baisers		Betsy Shepherd	1919
3688	L'Ardita -- Magnetic Waltz (Whistling) w/ Orchestra		Sibyl Fagan	
3689				
3690	A Good Man Is Hard To Find		Ernest Hare	
3691				
3692	Le Regiment de Sambr-et Meuse		New York Military Band	
3693				
3694	Say It Again		Rachel Grant & Billy Murray	
3695	Sometime		Leola Lucey And Charles Hart	1918
3696	Sand Dunes		All Star Trio	
3697				
3698	Kiss Me Again		Marie Tiffany	
3699				
3700	Holy, Holy, Holy! Lord God Almighty!		Calvary Choir	
3701	At A Georgia Camp Meeting		New York Military Band	
3702	Don't Cry, Little Girl, Don't Cry		Irving Kaufman	
3703	This Is The Time		Jaudas' Society Orchestra	
3704	Madelon	(w. Alfred Bryan m. Camille Robert)	[Arthur Fields]	
3705				
3706	Show Me The Way To Your Heart		Lewis James	
3707	The Right of The People To Rule		Theodore Roosevelt	
3708	The Farmer and The Businessman		Theodore Roosevelt	
3709	Social and Industrial Justice		Theodore Roosevelt	
3710	O'er The Billowy Sea		Donald Chalmers	
3711	Love is Idleness		Sodero's Band	
3712	A Coon Possum Hunt		Golden & Heins	
3713	Oh, Helen!		Arthur Fields	
3714	I Found the End of the Rainbow	(w. m. John Mears, Harry Tierney, & Joseph McCarthy)	Irving Kaufman	
3715	Spagoni's Wedding Jubilee		Billy Murray	
3716	Sensation Jazz One – Step		All Star Trio	
3717	What Mystery, Why Thus Control		Klatzkin & Mantia, cnt & tb	
3718				
3719				
3720				
3721				
3722	Peace Chimes March		New York Military Band	
3723				
3724				
3725	In the Land of Beginning Again	(w. Grant Clarke m. George W. Meyer)	George Wilton Ballard	
3726	How Ya Gonna Keep 'Em Down On the Farm After They've Seen Paree?	(w. Sam m. Lewis & Joe Young m. Walter Donaldson)	Byron G. Harlan	
3727	Every Day Will Be Sunday When The Town Goes Dry		Edward Meeker	
3728	The Day I First Met You		Lucey & Dalhart	
3729	Mammy's Lullaby		Premier Qrt	
3730	Johnny's In Town		Arthur Fields	
3731	The Better 'Ole One Step		Jaudas' Society Orc.	
3732	Wedding March		New York Military Band	
3733	Beautiful Ohio Waltz	(w. Ballard Macdonald m. Mary Earl)	Jaudas' Society Orchestra	
3734	I'm A Twelve O'Clock Fellow		Byron Harlan	
3735	The Alcoholic Blues		Vernon Dalhart	
3736	The Boy And The Birds		New York Military Band	
3737	Laverne		H. Bene Henton, sax	
3738	Hesitation Blues		Al Bernard	
3739	Mickey	(w. Harold H. Williams m. Neil Moret)	Vernon Dalhart	
3740	Kisses (The Sweetest Kisses Of All)		Gladys Rice	
3741	St. Louis Blues		All Star Trio	
3742	Bring Back Those Wonderful Days		Arthur Fields	
3743				
3744	Jazzie-Addie		Jazzarimba Orc	
3745	The Arkansas Traveler		Len Spencer	
3746	Satan, I'm Here		Ernest Hare	
3747	Salvation Lassie Of Mine		Clark & Hart	
3748				
3749	Somebody's Waiting For Somebody		Shepherd & Cox	
3750	After All		Irving Kaufman	
3751				
3752	Have A Smile For Everyone You Meet			
3753	I Hate To Lose You- Melody		Pietro Frosini, acc	
3754	Alderman Doolin's Campaign Speech		Steve Porter	
3755				
3756	Let Us Not Forget – A Message to the American People		Thomas A. Edison	
3757	National Airs of the Allies Companion cylinder to "Let Us Not Forget"		New York Military Band	
3758	That Wonderful Mother of Mine	(w. Clyde Hager m. Walter Goodwin)	Will Oakland	
3759	Beautiful Ohio		Metropolitan Quartet	
3760				
3761				
3762	Me-Ow – One Step		Jaudas' Society Orc.	
3763				
3764	You're Breaking My Heart With "Goodbye"		Leola Lucey	
3765	The Glowworm		We Girls Qrt.	
3766	Nigger Blues		Al Bernard	
3767	We're Going Over There		Premier Quartet	
3768	Evening Brings Rest And You		Edward Allen	1919
3769	Chong, He Comes From Hong Kong		Premier Quartet	
3770	In A Kingdom Of Our Own		Gladys Rice & G. Ballard	1919
3771	When The Cherry Blossoms Fall		Leola Lucy & C. Hart	1919
3772	Alabama Lullaby		Gladys Rice & Marion Cox	
3773	I Want To Hold You In My Arms		Bernard & Hare	
3774	Serenata – Narcissus		Sibyl Fagan, whi	
3775	In The Secret Of His Presence		Hart & Shaw	
3776	Waters of Venice		Rice & Dalhart	
3777	All Those In Favor Say "Aye"		Arthur Fields	
3778	Southern Melodies		J. F. Burchardt, bells	
3779	Mary		Tuxedo Dance Orchestra	1919
3780	Oh! Lawdy		Ada Jones	
3781	Dear Little Boy of Mine	(w. J. Keirn Brennan m. Ernest Ball)	Will Oakland	
3782	Turkestan		Premier Qrt.	
3783	Frenchy Come To Yankee Land		B. Murray & Chorus	1919
3784	Beale Street Blues		Al Bernard	
3785	Tears		Tuxedo Dance Orc	
3786				
3787	Jazzoia		Premier Qrt	
3788				
3789	B-Hap-E		Louisiana Five	
3790	Everyone Wants A Key To My Cellar		Al Bemard	
3791	You're Still An Old Sweetheart Of Mine		Metropolitan Qrt	
3792	Razzle-Dazzle		Lenzberg's Riverside Orc	
3793	Hezikiah Hopkins Comes To Town		Len Spencer	
3794	The Lord's Prayer, Doxology, Responses & Hymn		Rev. W. H. Morgan, DD & Calvary Choir	
3795	I Aint-em Got-em No Time To Have The Blues		B. Murray & Ed Smalle	1919
3796				
3797	The Word Is Hungry For A Little Bit Of Love		Vernon Dalhart	
3798	I'm Forever Blowing Bubbles		Clark & Ballard	
3799	Tiger Rose Waltzes		Lenzberg's Riverside Orc	
3800	Don't Cry Frenchie Don't Cry		C. Ballard	
3801	Heart Breaking Baby Doll		Arthur Fields	
3802	Egyptland – Fox Trot		Green Bros, Novelty Orchestra	
3803				
3804	Kentucky Dream		Lucey & Hart	
3805	Tenth Regimental March		Conway's Band	
3806	In My Daddy's Arms		Lenzberg's Riverside Orc	
3807	By The Babbling Brook		Fagan and James	1919
3808	Me-Ow		I. Kaufman	unknown
3809	Think, Love, Of Me		Gladys Rice	
3810	Ruspana – One-Step		Tuxedo Dance Orchestra	
3811	Lola -- Italian Serenade		Conway's Band	
3812	I'm Not Jealous		Grant & Murray	
3813	In Heavenly Love Abiding		Metropolitan Quartet	
3814	Wait And See (You'll Want Me Back)		Charles Hart	1919
3815				
3816	Selection from "The Royal Vagabond"		Peerless Orchestra	
3817	That Soothing Serenade		Betty Barrett	
3818	How Sandy Proposed		Jones & Spencer	
3819				
3820	Witches		George Ballard	
3821				
3822	When You Hold Me In Your Arms		Helen Clark & George Wilton Ballard	1919
3823				
3824	Fluffy Ruffles		Green Brothers Novelty Orchestra	
3825	Saxophobia – Fox Trot		Yerkes Saxophone Sextette	
3826	Luxembourg Waltz (Whistling)		Sibyl Fagan	
3827	Patrol of the Scouts		Conway's Band	
3828	Sweet Siamese – Fox Trot		Tuxedo Dance Orc	
3829	Why Did You Come Into My Life		Lewis James	
3830	The Opera At Pun'kin Center		Cal Stewart	
3831	A Bunch Of Roses – Spanish March		Conway's Band	
3832	Lonesome – That's All		George Ballard	
3833	The Ambassador Polka (Coronet)		Bohumir Kryl	
3834	When The Bees Make Honey		Irving & Jack Kaufman	
3835	A Police Court Scene		Steve Porter	
3836	Ragging The Chopsticks		Arthur Fields	
3837	Take Me To The Land Of Jazz		Bert Harvey	1919
3838	The Raggity Man		Edward Meeker	
3839	Dixie Is Dixie Once More		Premier Qrt	
3840	Danny's Return From France		Willis, Jones & Meeker	
3841	I'm Forever Blowing Bubbles – Medley Waltz		Tuxedo Dance Orc	
3842	Sweet Leonore		Lewis James	
3843	Foot Warmer		Louisiana Five	
3844	Colonel Stuart March		Conway's Band	
3845	Uncle Josh In A Cafeteria		Carl Stewart	
3846	Sipping Cider Thru a Straw (1919 song)	W.M. Carey Morgan & Lee David)	Collins & Harlan	
3847	You're Making A Miser Of Me		Rachael Grant	
3848	The Song That Reached My Heart		Lewis James	
3849				
3850	The Vamp -Oriental One-Step		Green Brothers Novelty Orc.	
3851	The 23rd Psalm & He Leadeth Me		Rev. W.H. Morgan	
3852	Today, Tomorrow and Forever		Edward Allen	
3853				
3854	Shake, Rattle and Roll		Al Bernard	
3855	I'm True To Them All, from "The Girl Behind The Gun"		Arthur Fields	
3856	Auld Lang Syne		Old Home Singers	
3857	A Race For A Wife		Ada Jones & Len Spencer	
3858	I 'm Sorry I Ain't Got It		Vernon Dalhart	
3859	Echo		Moor Capodiferro, flute & cnt.	
3860	The Wooing Hour		Peerless Orchestra	
3861	Heads Up March		Conway's Band	
3862	Uncle Josh And The Honey Bees		Cal Stewart	1919
3863	He Used To Be A Farmer But He's A Big Town Slicker Now		Byron Harlan	
3864	Night Time In Little Italy		Lenzberg's Riverside Orchestra	1919
3864B	Taxi		Lenzberg's Riverside Orchestra	
3865	Bye-Lo		Vernon Dalhart	
3866	I Love To Be A Sailor		Glen Ellison	
3867	Shadows		Lucey & Hart	
3868	Macushia		Albert Lindquest	
3869	Gypsy Girl		Tuxedo Dance Orc	
3870	Christmas Bells		Robert Gayler, celeste	
3871	Shimmee Town		All Star Trio	
3872	Oh! What a Pal Was Mary	(w. Edgar Leslie & Bert Kalmar m. Pete Wendling)	Edward Allen	
3873	Everybody's Crazy Over Dixie		Vernon Dalhart	
3874				
3875	A Day In Toyland		Peerless Orchestra	
3876	That Tumble-Down Shack in Athlone	(w. Richard W. Pascoe m. Monte Cobb & Alma M. Saunders)	Will Oakland	
3877	Did You Mean All You Told Me Last Night?		Manuel Romain	
3878				
3879	The Rose Of My Heart		Will Rhodes, Jr.	
3880	Shall You? Shall I?		Hart, Shaw & the Calvary Choir	
3881	See The Old Man Moon Smile		Bernard & Hare	
3882	I've Got My Captain Working for Me Now	(w.m. Irving Berlin)	Fred Hillebrand	
3883	My Baby's Arms from "Ziegfeld Follies of 1919"		Vernon Dalhart	
3884	Tears (Dry Your)		Green Brothers Novelty Band	
3885	I've Made Up My Mind To Mind A Maid		Clark & Philips	
3886	Romance from "L'Eclair"		Peerless Orchestra	
3887	We'll All Go Home The Same Way		Glen Ellison	
3888	Breeze, Blow My Baby Back To Me		Premier Quartet	
3889	Uncle Josh At The Museum		Cal Stewart ???	
3890	Uncle Josh And Aunt Nancy Put Up The Kitchen Stove		Cal Stewart & Aida Jones	
3891	Flirtation Valse		Conway's Band	
3892	Wait Until The Roses Bloom		Wheeler Wadsworth, sax.	
3893	You're My Gal		Bernard & Hare	
3894	I Know What It Means To Be Lonesome		Margaret Freer	
3895	My Desert Love		Lewis James	
3896	Clarinet Squawk – One-Step		Louisiana Five	
3897	In The Old Sweet Way		Clark & Ballard	
3898	A Cowboy Romance		Len Spencer & Co.	
3899	Little Arrow And Big Chief Greasepaint		Jones & Spencer	
3900	Granny		Marion Cox	
3901	Alexander's Band Is Back In Dixieland		Premier Qrt.	
3902	Cleo – Fox Trot		The All Star Trio	
3903	Fancy Little Nancy		Wheeler Wadsworth, sax.	
3904	Train Time At Pun'kin Center		Cal Stewart & Co.	
3905	The Same As His Father Did Before Him		Glen Ellison	
3906	'Twas An Old Fashioned Song He Was Singing		Lewis James	
3907	Windy Willie		New York Military Band	
3908	Love Blossom		Metropolitan Quartet	
3909	Yelping Hound Blues- Fox Trot		Louisiana Five	
3910	Floatin' Down To Cotton Town		Premier Quartet	
3911	Nobody Ever		Tuxedo Dance Band	
3912	Back Home On The Farm		Golden & Hughes	
3913	I'm A Dancing Fool		Al Bernard	
3914	I Love You Just The Same Sweet Adeline		Premier Quartet	
3915	Carolina Sunshine		Vernon Dalhart	
3916	Love's Adieu		Archibald & James	
3917	Serenade D'Amour		Imperial Marimba Band	
3918	Abandonado. Mexican waltz		Peerless Orchestra	
3919	Good-Bye, Beloved, Good-Bye		Virginia Rea & Male Qrt	
3920	Henry Jones, Your Honeymoon is Over		Bernard & Hare	
3921	A Picture Of Long Ago		Jones & Spencer	
3922	Broken Blossoms		Clark & Ballard	
3923	Uncle Josh's Birthday		Cal Stewart & Co.	
3924	Rainy Day Blues		Yerkes Saxophone Sxt	
3925	Tents of Arabs		Tuxedo Dance Orc.	
3926				
3927	The Turkish Patrol		Edison Concert Band	
3928				
3929	Since You First Smiled On Me		Herbert Tilley, Jr.	
3930	St. Louis Blues		Al Bernard	
3931	Davy Jones' Locker		Fred East	
3932	In Tyrol – Yodel Song		Frank Kamplain	
3933	Golden Gate, Open For Me		Lewis James & Louie Ferrell	
3934	Freckles		Bert Harvey	
3935	St. Patrick's Day Melody		Larry Brier's	
3936	Flanagan's Real Estate Deal		S. Porter	
3937	A Bullfrog Am No Nightingale		Ernest Hare Chorus	
3938	Floating Down The Old Monongahela		Charles Hart	
3939				
3940	In Siam - Medley Fox Trot		All Star Trio	
3941	Nobody Knows		Louise Terrell	
3942	The Bell Hops		Golden & Hughes	
3943	Now I know		The Lyric Male Quartet	
3944	Who Wants A Baby?		Lenzberg's Riverside Orchestra	
3945	Molly Malone, from " Passing Show of 1919"		Charles Hart	
3946	Backyard Conversation		Jones & Porter	
3947	Lisztiana		Conway's Band	
3948	Shall We Meet?	Archibald & L. James	Raderman's Jazz Orchestra	
3949	Chasin' The Blues		Al Bernard	
3950	Sweet And Low		Tuxedo Dance Orchestra	
3951	The Nightingale Song -Yodel Song		Frank Kamplain	
3952	Lucille		All Star Trio	
3953	Sahara, We'll Soon Be Dry Like You		Billy Murray	
3954	Pretty Little Rainbow – Waltz		Lenzberg's Riverside Orchestra	
3955	Let the Rest of the World Go By	(w. J. Keirn Brennan m. Ernest R. Ball)	Marion Evelyn Cox & Harvey Hindermeyer	
3956				
3957	A Matrimonial Mixup		Golden & Hughes	
3958	Little Girls, Goodbye		Lewis James	
3959	The Mighty Deep		W. Glenn	
3960	Linger Longer Letty		Helen Clark & J. Phillips	
3961	It's The Smart Little Feller		Maurice Burkhart	
3962	Dixie Lullaby		Homestead Trio	
3963	Sunny Weather Friends		Harvey Hindermeyer	
3964	You'd Be Surprised	(W. M. Irving Berlin)	Billy Murray	
3965	Dardanella – Fox Trot		Harry Raderman's Jazz Orchestra	
3966	Make That Trombone Laugh		Harry Raderman's Jazz Orchestra	
3967	He Went In Like A Lion And Came Out Like A Lamb		Al Bernard	
3968	Triplets		George H. Green, xyl.	
3969	Flanagan's Troubles In A Restaurant		Steve Porter	
3970	Snoop's, The Lawyer		Maurice Burkhart	
3971	Was There Ever A Pal Like You?		George Ballard	
3972	Old-Fashioned Garden from "Hitchy-Koo. 1919	(w.m. Cole Porter)	Helen Clark	1919
3973	Buddha – Melody		Lenzberg's Riverside Quartet	
3974	There's Not A Song That Trembles		Shepherd & Clark	
3975	You Are Free, from "Apple Blossoms"		Betsy Sheppard & Lewis James	
3976	When Honey Sings an Old Time Song	(w.m. Joseph B. Carey)	George Wilton Ballard	
3977	Love's Rosary		Charles Hart	
3978	Hippity Hop		Premier Quartet	
3979	Roll On, Silvery Moon		Frank Kamplain	
3980	I Come From Get-It-Land		Bernard & Hare	
3981	Once Upon A Time from "Majic Melody"		Lewis James	
3982	You're a Million Miles from Nowhere When You're One Little Mile from Home	(w. Sam Lewis & Joe Young m. Walter Donaldson)	William Bonner	
3983	Karavan		Lenzberg's Riverside Orchestra	
3984				
3985	Oh, Gee! - Medley of Irish Reels		John J. Kimmel & Joe Linder, acc. & pno	
3986	For You		Helen Clark	
3987	The Cruiskeen Lawn from " The Lily of Killarney"		Leona Lucey	
3988	Swanee		Bernard & Kamplain	
3989	Patches- Fox-Trot		Lopez & Hamilton's Kings Of Harmony	
3990	My Isle of Golden Dreams	(w. Gus Kahn m. Walter Blaufuss)	Tuxedo Orchestra	
3991	Yellow Dog Blues		Harry Raderman's Jazz Orc:	
3992	Flanagan's Night Off		Jones & Porter	
3993	When My Baby Smiles – Fox Trot		All Star Trio	
3994				
3995	Comrade O'Mine		George Ballard	
3996	Crimson Blushes		American Symphony Orchestra	
3997	The Blues My Naughty Sweetie Gives To Me		Harry Raderman's Jazz Orchestra	
3998	Buddies - Waltz		Lenzberg's Riverside Orchestra	
3999	The Country Fair At Pun'kin Center		Cal Stewart	
4000	The Devil's Dream Melody (Reels), vin.		Violin Solo Joseph Samuels Pianoforte by Larry Briers	
4001	"O" (Oh!)	(w. Byron Gay m. Arnold Johnson)	Billy Murray	
4002	My Friends, Morris And Max		Maurice Burkhart	
4003	Don't You Remember The Time?		Terrell & Ballard	
4004	Pittsburgh, Pa.		Monroe Silver	
4005	Saxema		Rudy Wiedoeft, sax	
4006	Peggy-One Step	(w. Harry Williams m. Neil Moret)	Lopez & Hamilton's Kings of Harmony	
4007	Say It With Flowers		Vernon Dalhart Chorus	
4008	Leugit Ve Berg Und Tal		Fritz Zimmerman, yod	
4009	Just Like The Rose- Fox Trot		The All Star Trio, sax, pno & xyl	
4010				
4011	In The Shadow Of The Desert Palm		Betty Barrett & H. Wilson	
4012	It's A Small World After All		F. J. Wheeler	
4013	I Might Be Your 'Once In A While' from "Angel Face"		Leola Lucey	
4014				
4015				
4016	When You Write, Sweet Marie		Vernon Dalhart	
4017	Left All Alone Again Blues, from "The Night Boat"		Rachael Grant	
4018	Daddy, You've been a Mother to Me	(w.m. Fred Fisher)	George Wilton Ballard	
4019	Everybody Calls Me Honey		Helen Clark	1920
4020	Bo- La Bo – Egyptian Fox Trot		Maurice Burkhart	
4021	Who Ate Napoleons With Josephine, from "As You Are"		Maurice Burkhart	
4022				
4023	A Spring Morning – Intermezzo		Sibyl Sanderson Fagan., whi.	
4024	Unlucky Blues		Al Bernard	
4025				
4026				
4027	Rose of Washington Square	(w. Ballard Macdonald m. James F. Hanley)	Lenzberg's Riverside Orchestra	
4028	Let's All Be Good Pals Together		Young & Wheeler	
4029	Cohen on his Honeymoon		Monroe Silver	
4030	Only A Step To Jesus		East & James	
4031	Kaiwi Waltz		Toots Paka's Hawaiians. gtrs duet	
4032	Dancing In The Barn – Schottische		National Promenade Band	
4033	Brazilian Chimes		Crescent Trio	
4034				
4035				
4036	On Miami Shore- Waltz	(w. William Le Baron m. Victor Jacobi)	Max Fell's Della Robbia Orchestra	
4037				
4038	Hawaiian Twilight		Waikiki Hawaiian Orchestra	
4039	The Pickaninny Blues		Crescent Trio	
4040	When Your Gone, I Won't Forget		Terrell & Ballard	
4041	Oh, By Jingo Oh, By Gee You're the Only Girl for Me	(w. Lew Brown m. Albert Von Tilzer)	Premier Quartette	
4042	Dardanella	(w. Fred Fisher m. Felix Bernard & Johnny S. Black)	Gladys Rice & Vernon Dalhart	
4043				
4044				
4045	All Over The World		Fisk University Jubilee Quartet	
4046	Semper Fedelis March		United States Military Band	
4047	Everybody's Buddy		Lewis James	
4048	Oh! How I Laugh When I Think How I Cried About You		Rachel Grant & Billy Murray	
4049	Bow-Wow		Wiedoeft & Wadsworth Quartet	
4050	Oh Joe – Please Don't Go			
4051				
4052	Hawaiian Smiles		Waikiki Hawaiian Orchestra	
4053				
4054	Dinnie Donohue, The District Leader		William Cahill	
4055	As You Are		Hart & James	
4056	La Veeda	(w. Nat Vincent m. John Alden)	Max Fell's Della Robbia Orchestra	
4057	Sweeter As The Years Go By		Helen Davis & Charles Hart	
4058	Alabama Moon		Gladys Rice	
4059	Alexandria		Max Fell's Della Robbia Qrc	
4060	Ages And Ages		George Ballard	
4061	I'll Always Keep A Corner In My Heart For Tennessee		Reese Jones	
4062	That Naughty Waltz		Clark & Phillips	
4063	Moon Shine On The Moonshine		Bernard & Hare	
4064	Who'll Take The Place Of Mary?		Talbert O'Farrell	
4065	Pretty Kitty Kelly		William Bonner	
4066	My Sanara Rose Medley – Fox Trot		Wiedoeft – Wadworth Quar	
4067	At The Moving Picture Ball		Maurice Burkhart	
4068				
4069	Beautiful Hawaii Waltz		Waikiki Hawaiian Waltz	
4070	I'd Love To Fall Asleep And Wake Up In Mummy's Arms		Reese Jones	
4071	My Lovin' Sing Song Man		Bernard & Kamplain	
4072	I'll See You in C-U-B-A	(w.m. Irving Berlin)	Fred Hillebrand	
4073	One Loving Caress		Rice & Cox	
4074	Ching-a-Ling's Jazz Bazaar		Mack & Miller	
4075	Karzan		Green Bros. Novelty Orc	
4076	Haley's Fancy		John J. Kimmel, acc.	
4077	Uncle Josh and The Sailor		Cal Stewart	
4078				
4079	Oriental Stars – One Step		Green Bros. Novelty Orc	
4080				
4081	You've Been The Sunshine Of My Life		Lewis James	
4082	Goodbye Sunshine, Hello Moon		Helen Clark	
4083	The Argentines, The Portuguese And The Greeks.		Ed Meeker	
4084	Wyoming		Fell's Della Robbia Orc	
4085	Pretty Kitty Kelly	(w. Harry Pease m. Ed G. Nelson)	William Bonner	
4086	Stop It! - One Step		Green Bros. Novelty Band.	
4087	There's A Typical Tipperary Over Here		Premier Qrt	
4088	When A Peach In Georgia Weds A Rose From Alabama		Hart & James	
4089	I Know Why		Clark & Phillips	
4090	The American Legion March		Conway's Band	
4091				
4092				
4093	Old Man Jazz		Arthur Collins	
4094				
4095				
4096	Close To Your Heart		Gladys Rice	
4097	I Love The Land Of Old Black Joe, from Ed Wynn's Carnival"		Vaughn De Leath	
4098	Jean – Medley Fox Trot		Wiedoeft's Palace Orchestra	
4099	The Pilot Brave		Hart & East	
4100				
4101				
4102	Home At Last		Harvey Hindermeyer	
4103	Chili Bean	(w. Lew Brown m. Albert Von Tilzer)	Billy Murray	
4104	That Old Fashioned Mother Of Mine		Talbert O'Farrell	
4105	Your Voice Came Back To Me		Gladys Rice	
4106				
4107				
4108	Alice Blue Gown, from "Irene"		Helen Clark	
4109	What's The Good Of Kicking		Maurice Burkhart	
4110	Bound In Morocco		Green Bros. Novelty Orc	
4111				
4112	Polly		Premier Quartet	
4113	Valse Caprice, No. 1		P. Frosini, acc	
4114	Tired Of Me		George Ballard	
4115	Dance-O-Mania		Lenzberg's Riverside Orc	
4116	Mississippi Bound		Al Bernard	
4117	Mary, from "The Love Nest"		Terrell & Ballard	
4118				
4119	Missy – Medley Fox Trot		Wiedoeft's Palace Trio	
4120	Washington Gray's March		Conway's Band	
4121	Wailana Waltz		Toots Paka's Hawaiians	
4122	It Pays To Serve Jesus		Mr. & Mrs. George Nhare	
4123	Jennie Fox Trot		Stevens' Quartet	
4124				
4125	Fantasia from "Simon Boccanegra"		Caso & Giammatteo, flute & cla	
4126				
4127	My Garden of Love		Lewis James	
4128	Kol Nidrei, Part 1		Lauri & Dorothy Kennedy, vic & pno	
4129	Medley of Old Time Tunes		Pietro Frosini, acc.	
4130	You Can't Trust Nobody		Ernest Hare	
4131	The Wedding Of The Rose – Intermezzo		Conway's Band	
4132	On The Dreamy Amazon		Herbert Tilley, Jr.	
4133	I Want A Jazzy Kiss		Collins & Clark	
4134	Our Director March		Conway's Band	
4135	In Sweet September		Green Bros. Novelty Band	
4136	Celestial Chimes		Robert Gayler, celeste	
4137				
4138	Hawaiian Twilight		Waikiki Hawaiian Orchestra	
4139	The Kingdom Within Your Eyes		Talbert O'Farrell	
4140	Love. Here Is My Heart		Reed Miller	
4140	I Wish That You Was My Gal, Molly	(w.m. Irving Berlin & Ted Snyder)	Manuel Romain	
4141	The Love Nest Medley		Imperial Marimba Band	
4142	The Chautauqua at Pun'kin Center		Cal Stewart	
4143				
4144				
4145				
4146	Pussy Willow Waltzes		Imperial Marimba Band	
4147	My Little Bimbo Down On The Bamboo Isle		Aileen Stanley	
4148	Messe Solennelle De Saint Cecelia Sanctus		Albert Lindquest & Calvary Choir	
4149	All She'd Say Was "Umh Hum"	(w.m. King Zany, Mac Emery, Gus Van & Joe Schenck)	Reese Jones	
4150				
4151	Keep The Love Lamp Burning		Gladys Rice	
4152	Return of Spring – Waltz		Three Vagrants	
4153	Sweet Luana		Rice & Lennox	
4154	Bonnie Brier Bush March		Conway's Band	
4155	In Old Manila		Shepherd & James	
4156	Railroad Blues		Raderman's Jazz Orc.	
4157	Hungarian Rhapsody (Popper)		Lauri Kennedy, 'cello	
4158	Railroad Blues		Raderman's Jazz Orc	
4159	When I Looked In Your Wonderful Eyes		Edward Allen	
4160	Venetian Moon		Rae Eleanor Ball, vin.	
4161	Witch Of The Waves Medley - Reels		Joseph Samuels. vin.	
4162	Curro Cuchares March		Pietro Frosini, acc	
4163	Sally Green, The Village Vamp		Premier Quartet	
4164				
4165	Slide, Kelly, Slide		Al Bernard & Ernest Hare	
4166	Feather Your Nest – Fox Trot	(w. m. James Kendis, James Brockman & Howard Johnson)	Lenzberg's Riverside Orchestra	
4167	The Four Jacks March		Pietro Frosini, acc.	
4168				
4169	Dinnie Donahue On Prohibition		William Cahill	
4170	Love's A Magic Spell & Snyder, Does Your Know You Are Out		George Watson	
4171	Whispering – Fox Trot		Green Brothers' Novelty Band	
4172	Change Your Name Melinda Lee		Al Bernard & E. Hare	
4173				
4174				
4175				
4176	Our Little Love Affair		Shepherd & James	
4177	Mother Machree		Albert Lindquest	
4178				
4179	Sunrise and You		Herbert Tilley, Jr.	
4180				
4181	The Broadway Blues	w. Arthur Swanstrom m. Carey Morgan	Al Bernard	
4182	Avalon (Al Jolson song)	(w.m. B. G. Desylva, Al Jolson & Vincent Rose)	Harry Raderman's Jazz Orchestra	
4183	My Home Town Is A One Horse Town		Jim Doherty	
4184	Old Pal, Why Don't You Answer Me	(w. Sam M. Lewis & Joe Young m. M.K. Jerome)	Lewis James	
4185	Down In Chinatown		Premier Quartet	
4186	The Crocodile		Imperial Marimba Band	
4187	Tarentella Siciliana		Three Vagrants	
4188	Sleep Little Babe		Fritz Zimmerman & Marcelle Grandville	
4189	Son-O'-Mine		Elizabeth Spencer	
4190	Speed – One Step		Lenzberg's Riverside Orchestra	
4191	Pickaninny Rose		Margaret Freer	
4192	The Life Insurance Policy		Golden & Hughes	
4193	Je Ne Sais Pa Pa		Harry Raderman's Jazz Orc.	
4194				
4195	Les Cloches De St. Malo		Conway's Band	
4196	Sudan		Green Brother's Novelty Band	
4197	A Perfect Day		Lou Chila "Frisco", xyl.	
4198	Sweet Hour Of Prayer		Metropolitan Qrt	
4199				
4200	The Hula Blues		Harry Raderman's Jazz Orchestra	
4201				
4202				
4203				
4204	Where Is My Daddy Now Blues		Aileen Stanley	
4205	La Chanson Des Nids		Brissett & Giammatteo CLAS.	
4206				
4207	Lindy		Premier Quartet	
4208	Garden Of Roses		Lewis James	
4209	Broadway Rose	(w. Eugene West m. Martin Fried & Otis Spencer)	Lyric Male Quartet	
4210	Beela Boola		Electric City Four	
4211	Bell's Of St. Mary's		Lewis James	
4212	I'm A Lonesome Little Raindrop		Reese Jones	
4213	Darling – Medley		Max Fell's Della Robbia Orchestra	
4214	12th Street Rag		Imperial Marimba Band	
4215	Ragtime At Pun'kin Center		Cal Stewart	
4216				
4217	Annie, My Own – Fox Trot		Harry Raderman's Jazz Orchestra	
4218				
4219	I've Got The Blues For My Kentucky Home		Premier Qrt	
4220	Margie – Fox Trot		Max Fell's Della Robbia Orchestra	
4221	Play Me A Dixie Melody		Al Bernard	
4222	Miss Johnson's Party		Joseph Samuels, vin	
4223				
4224	Broadway Rose	(w. Eugene West m. Martin Fried & Otis Spencer)	Raderman's Jazz Orchestra	
4225	Home Again Blues	(w.m. Harry Akst & Irving Berlin)	Raderman's Jazz Orchestra	
4226	Palasteena – Fox Trot		Greene Bros. Novelty Band	
4227	My Mammy	(w. Sam M. Lewis & Joe Young m. Walter Donaldson)	Premier Quartette	
4228	Timbuctoo		Al Bernard	
4229				
4230	Good-Bye – Lady Billy		Spencer & James	
4231	Caresses – Fox Trot		Lenzberg's Riverside Orc.	
4232	Pocahontas		Premier Qrt	
4233	She Walks In Her Husband's Sleep		Aileen Stanley	
4234	The Royal Tour March		Shirley Spaulding, bjo.	
4235				
4236	That Old Irish Mother of Mine	(w. William Jerome m. Harry Von Tilzer)	Allen McQuhae	
4237	Sweet and Low		J. Levy's Brass Band	
4238	Down The Trail To Home Sweet Home		Hart & James	
4239	Recollections of 1861 to 1865		Edna White	1921
4240				
4241	Favorite Hymns Of Fanny Crosby, No. 2		Calvary Choir	
4242	Bright Eyes	(w. Harry B. Smith m. Otto Motzan & M.K. Jerome)	Orlando's Orchestra	
4243				
4244				
4245	Humming		Orlando's Orc	
4246	Do You Ever Think of Me?	(w. John Cooper & Harry D. Kerr m. Earl Burtnett)	Raderman's Jazz Orchestra	
4247				
4248				
4249				
4250	The Debutante - Caprice Brillante	Herbert L. Clarke	Trumpet with Orchestra Edna white	
4251	Rebecca		James Doherty	
4252				
4253	Will You Love Me When I'm Old?		Elizabeth Spencer	
4254				
4255	Arabia		Green Bros. Novelty Band	
4256	There's A Little Bit Of Irish In US All		Aileen Stanley	
4257	Mother Of Pearl		G. Ballard	
4258	Honey		Olive Briscoe	
4259	Danse Arlequin		Shirley Spaulding, bjo	
4260				
4261				
4262	The Light Of The World Is Jesus		Metropolitan Qrt	
4263				
4264	Crazy Blues	(w.m. Percy Bradford)	Noble Sissle	
4265				
4266				
4267	I Like It		Lenzberg's Riverside Orchestra	
4268				
4269				
4270				
4271	A Scene On The Levee		Billy Golden & The Empire Vaudeville Co.	
4272	Siren of A Southern Sea		Green Bros. Novelty Band	
4273	Playmates		Clark & Phillips	
4274				
4275	Country Days		Al Weston & Irene Young	
4276				
4277	Uncle Josh Takes The Census		Cal Stewart	
4278				
4279	Come And Nestle In Your Daddy's Arms		Lenzberg's Riverside Orc.	
4280	To The Stains Of The Wedding March		Marguerite Farrell	
4281				
4282				
4283	Margie		Harvey Hindermeyer	
4284				
4285				
4286				
4287				
4288				
4289	Calling		Max Fell's Della Robbia Orc	
4290	The Arabian Yogian		Max Fells' Della Robbia Orchestra	
4291	I Call You Sunshine – Medley		Harry Raderman's Jazz Band	
4292				
4293				
4294				
4295	Light Cavalry Overture		Edison Concert Band	
4296	At The Circus		Weston & Young	
4297	The Bird and The Saxophone		Sibyl Fagan	
4298	Loveless Love	(w.m. W. C. Handy)	Ernest Hare	
4299	Pass Me Not, O Gentle Saviour		Metropolitan Orchestra	
4300				
4301	Ump-Pah- Pah		Al Bernard	
4302	Congo Nights		Green Bros. Novelty Band	
4303				
4304	Scene On The Old Plantation		Golden & Empire Vaudeville Co.	
4305	Oh Yeedle Ay		Bernard & Kamplain	
4306	I Want To Be The Leader Of The Band		Premier Qrt.	
4307				
4308				
4309	Ain't We Got Fun		Billy Jones	
4310	I Found A Rose In The Devil's Garden		Harry Raderman's' Jazz Orc	
4311	Kiss A Miss Medley		Green Brothers Novelty Band	
4312	Hey Paw		Premier Quartet	
4313				
4314	Sleepy Hollow Waltz		Green Brothers Novelty Band	
4315				
4316				
4317				
4318				
4319				
4320	Never Give Up		Metropolitan Quartet	
4321	Nobody's Rose		George Ballard	
4322	County Kerry Mary		William Bonner	
4323	I'll Keep On Loving You		Max Fell's Della Robbia Orchestra	
4324	It Ain't Gonna Rain No Mo'		Wendell Hall	
4325	I Was Born In Michigan		Premier Quartet	
4326	American Pep March	George Hamilton Green	Imperial Marimba Band	
4327	I'm Nobody's Baby		Alleen Stanley	
4328	Peggy O'Neill	(w. m. Harry Pease, Ed G. Nelson & Gilbert Dodge)	Billy Jones Orchestra	
4329	Moonlight – Fox Trot		Max Fells' Della Robbia Orc.	
4330				
4331	Down Yonder	( w. m. L. Wolfe Gilbert)	Premier Quartette	
4332				
4333				
4334				
4335				
4336				
4337				
4338				
4339				
4340	The Last Little Mile Is The Longest		Lewis James	
4341	Good As Gold - Waltz		Max Fells' Della Robbia Orc	
4342	Lucky Jim		Criterion Qrt	
4343				
4344				
4345				
4346				
4347				
4348				
4349				
4350				
4351	Oh! They're Such Nice People		Billy Jones	
4352	All By Myself		Helen Clark	
4353				
4354	A Baby in Love – Fox Trot		Club de Vinct Orch	
4355	Second Hand Rose-Medley		Broadway Dance Orc	
4356	Cho Cho San- Fox Trot		Conrad's Orc	
4357				
4358	You're The Sweetest Girl In The World		Harry Raderman's Jazz Orc	
4359	She's The Lass For Me		Glen Ellison	
4360	The Sinner And The Song		Fred East	
4361	Carolina Lullaby		Homestead Trio	
4362				
4363	Waltz Florida		Conrad's Orchestra	
4364				
4365	Jane		Lanin's Orchestra	
4366				
4367				
4368				
4369	Dearest One		Shepherd & Spencer	
4370	Valse Caprice		Losey's Orchestra	
4371				
4372	It Must Be Someone Like You- Fox Trot		Club De Vingt Orc	
4373				
4374				
4375				
4376	My Galway Rose		Walter Scanlan	
4377				
4378				
4379				
4380	Ma, Medley		Harry Raderman's Jazz Orc	
4381	I Wonder If You Still Care For Me?		Walter Scanlan	
4382	Catalina		Broadway Dance Orchestra	
4383				
4384	Ain't You Comin' Out Malinda?		Bernard & Hare	
4385	Canadian Capers		H. Raderman's Jazz Orchestra	
4386				
4387				
4388				
4389				
4390	The Portobello Lassie		Glen Ellison	
4391	Down At The Old Swimming Hole		Jones & Hare	
4392				
4393	Mavoumeen – Irish Eyes		Walter Scanlan	
4394	My Sunny Tennessee - Fox Trot		Broadway Dance Orc	
4395	Yield Not To Temptation		Metropolitan Qrt	
4396	If Only You Knew		Allen Rogers	
4397	Gee Willikens		Byron Harlan	
4398	Tenderly - Fox Trot		Club De Vingt Orc	
4399				
4400	My Little Sister Mary		Lewis James	
4401				
4402	Bells Of Old Trinity, New York		Christmas Carols	
4403	Why Dear?		Raderman's Jazz Orchestra	
4404	On A Little Side Street		Jones & Jones	
4405	Sweet Lady - Medley Fox Trot		Broadway Dance Orch	
4406	By The Waters Of Killarney		Broadway Dance Orc	
4407				
4408				
4409				
4410				
4411				
4412				
4413				
4414	Tuck Me to Sleep in My Old 'Tucky Home	(w. Sam H. Lewis & Joe Young m. George W. Meyer)	Ray Cropper	
4415	I Know Why Your Mother Called You "Baby"		Club De Vingt Orc	
4416	Mother, I Don't Understand		Walter Scanlan	
4417	The Maid of the Mountains - Selection	Harold Fraser-Simson	The Peerless Orchestra	
4418				
4419	Dreamy Hawaii - Waltz		Waikiki Hawaiian Orc	
4420	Kentucky Home		Crescent Trio	
4421				
4422	When You And I Were Young, Maggie		Herbert Soman, vin	
4423	Yoo-Hoo		Lanin's Orc	
4424	Molly On The Trolley		Dalhart & Shepard	
4425	When Francis Dances With Me		Ada Jones & Billy Jones	
4426	Three O'clock In The Morning- Waltz		Club de Vingt Orchestra	
4427	Ten Little Fingers And Ten Little Toes	(w. Harry Pease & Johnny White m. Ira Schuster & Ed G. Nelson)	Jones & Hare	
4428				
4429				
4430				
4431				
4432				
4433	Brazil		Max Fell's Della Robbia Orc.	
4434	Jane		Crescent Trio	
4435	Sadie's Birthday Party " Edge says " Made In U.S.A. " "		Julian Rose	
4436	O Happy Day		Metropolitan Quartet	
4437				
4438	The Waggie O' The Kilt		Glen Ellison	
4439				
4440	Carolina Lullaby		Rae Eleanor Ball, vin.	
4441	Silver Sands Of Love		Spencer & Hart	
4442	Rosy Cheeks		Club De Vingt Orchestra	
4443	I Want To Stand On Dixie Land		Al Bernard	
4444				
4445				
4446				
4447	Plantation Lullaby		Crescent Trio	
4448				
4449	Shuffle Along		Harry Raderman's Jazz Orc	
4450	When Buddha Smiles		Club de Vingt Orchestra	1922
4451	Wabash Blues "Edge says "Made in U.S.A." "		Broadway Dance Orchestra	1922
4452	Georgia Rose "Edge says "Made In U.S.A." "		Wiedoeft's Californians	1922
4453	Have You Forgotten ?		Club De Vingt	1922
4454	Sal-O-May Fox Trot		Broadway Dance Orc	
4455				
4456				
4457	The Wonderland of Dreams		Rae Eleanor Ball, vin.	
4458				
4459	Dapper Dan	(w. Lew Brown m. Albert Von Tilzer)	Jones & Hare	
4460				
4461	Hot Lips		Ernest Stevens' Trio	
4461A	It's New		Wiedoeft Californians (possibly the correct title for this number- rare)	
4462				
4463				
4464				
4465	Tea Cup Girl		Lenzberg's Riverside Orchestra	
4466				
4467	Remember The Rose		Shepherd & James	
4468	Little Min-Nee-Ha "Edge says "Made in U.S.A." "		Isabelle Patricola	
4469				
4470	Weep No More		Harry Raderman's Jazz Orc	
4471	Tuck Me To Sleep		Lou Chiha " Frisco" xyl	
4472	Leave Me With A Smile – Fox Trot		Club De Vingt Orchestra	
4473				
4474				
4475				
4476	When Shall We Meet Again	Richard A. Whiting	Gladys Rice & Lewis James	
4477	I've Got My Habits On		Bernard & Dalhart	
4478				
4479	Down In Midnight Town		Premier Qrt	
4480	If You Like Me Like I Like You		Lewis James	
4481	Judy, from "Irish Eyes"		Walter Scanlan	1922
4482				
4483				
4484	He Will Hide Me		Metropolitan Qrt	
4485				
4486				
4487				
4488				
4489				
4490				
4491	Polonaise Militaire	Frédéric Chopin	United States Marine Band	1922
4492	Mother Of My Heart		Jerome Uhl	
4493				
4494				
4495				
4496	Brother Low Down		Al Bernard	
4497				
4498				
4499	Blue Brid Inspiration		Imperial Marimba Band	

== Edison Blue Amberols 4500–29076 ==
Issue number	Title	Writer(s)	Performer(s)	Date
4500	Those Days Are Over		George Wilton Ballard	1922
4501	Marie		Green Bros. Novelty Band	1922
4502	When I Was Twenty-One		Glen Ellison	1920
4503	Oh Day of Rest and Gladness		Metropolitan Quartette	1921
4504	Thinking of You (I've Grown So Lonesome)		The Homestead Trio	1921
4505	I Ain't Nobody's Darling		Byron G. Harlan	1921
4506	Up In The Clouds		Green Bros. Novelty Band	1922
4507	Up In The Clouds		Lewis James and Elizabeth Spencer	1922
4508	Dear Old Southland	(w. Henry Creamer m. Turner Layton)	Vernon Dalhart	1922
4509	The Rosary You Gave To Me	Harry von Tilzer	Walter Van Brunt	1922
4510	Monastery Bells - Waltz		H. Lange, pno	
4511	Tyrol		Al Bernard and Frank M. Kamplain	1922
4512	Cutie		Harry Raderman's Jazz Orc.	
4513	A Sleepy Little Village		Billy Jones	
4514	While Miami Dreams- Fox Trot		Imperial Marimba Band	
4515				
4516				
4517				
4518	Where My Caravan Has Rested		Lewis James	
4519				
4520	A Country Fiddler At Home		Charles Ross Taggart	
4521				
4522				
4523	Ragtime Echos		Siegel & Caveny, mandolin & uke	
4524				
4525				
4526	My Sweet Egyptian Rose		Vernon Dalhart	
4527				
4528				
4529	Who Stole The Chickens?		Golden & Hughes	
4530				
4531				
4532	Blue Danube Blues & Ka-Lu-A, from "Good Morning, Dearie"		Ray Perkins, pno	
4533				
4534	Who – Believed In You?		H. Lange, pho.	
4535				
4536	I Ain't Nobody's Darling		Ray Perkins, pno	
4537				
4538				
4539				
4540				
4541	Come, Thou Fount Of Ev'ry Blessing		Metropolitan Quartet	
4542	Faithless Heart [Core 'ngrato]		Emory B. Randolph	1922
4543	Cord And Tassel Dance		Reed Orchestra	
4544				
4545				
4546	Carry Me Back To Old Virginny		F. MacMurray, vin.	
4547	Toreador Of Mine		Shepherd & Hart	
4548				
4549				
4550	Forget Me Not		America Sym Orc	
4551				
4552	Blue Bird		Broadway Dance Orc	
4553	In the Little Red School House		G. Jones & E. Hare	
4554	Nola		Lopez & Hamilton Orc	
4555	Memories Of The South		Ernest L. Stevens, pno.	
4556				
4557	Pick Me Up And Lay Me Down In Dear Old Dixieland		Don Parker Instrumental Trio	
4558	The Laughing Girl Has Her Picture Took – Norwegian – English Monologue		Ethel C. Olson	
4559				
4560	On A Little Side Street- Medley Waltz		Emest L. Stevens, pno	
4561				
4562				
4563				
4564				
4565				
4566				
4567	The Little Tin Soldier		Homestead Trio	
4568	Ida Caprice		Reed Orchestra	
4569				
4570				
4571	Georgia-Fox Trot		Don Parker Trio	
4572				
4573				
4574	California – Fox Trot		Vincent Lopez orchestra	
4575	Swaying – Waltz		Ernest L. Stevens, pno	
4576				
4577				
4578				
4579	Yiddisher Jazz		Julian Rose	
4580				
4581				
4582				
4583				
4584	Flanagan And His Motor Car		Steve Porter	
3585	There's Silver In Your Hair		Lewis James	
4586				
4587				
4588				
4589	Erin, You're Wearin' A Wonderful Smile		Walter Scanlan	
4590				
4591				
4592				
4593	I'll Dream Of You - Fox Trot		Vincent Lopez' Orc	
4594	Suppose The Rose Were You		Ernest L. Stevens' Trio	
4595				
4596				
4597	Sweet Indiana Home		Broadway Dance Orc	
4598				
4599				
4600	Fireflies	Paul Lincke	Reed Orchestra	
4601				
4602				
4603				
4604	I'm Just Wild About Mary		Vincent Lopez' Orc	
4605				
4606	Serenade	Moszkowski	Creatore and his Band	
4607				
4608	When You And I Were Young Maggie, Blues		Billy Jones	
4609				
4610	Stumbling – Fox Trot		Broadway Dance Band	
4611	Soothing - Fox Trot		Ernest Stevens' Trio	
4612	I Want To Buy A Ticket To A Little One Horse Town		Al Barnard	
4613	Hawaiian Nightingale		Palakio's Hawaiian Orchestra	
4614	Parade Of The Wooden Soldiers – Novelty March		Vincent Lopez Orchestra	
4615				
4616	The Maid From The Highlands	Gustav Lange	American Symphony Orchestra	
4517				
4618				
4619				
4620	A Country Fiddler At Home		Charles Ross Taggart	
4621				
4622	Noctume in A Flat, Op 290	Bohm	Reed Orchestra	
4623				
4624				
4625	Just Keep On Smiling		J. Harold Murray	
4626				
4627	Ham & Eggs		Collins & Harlan	
4628	If Winter Comes		Atlantic Dance Orchestra	
4629				
4630				
4631	Lovable Eyes		Atlantic Dance Orchestra	
4632	Georgette – Fox Trot		Atlantic Dance Orchestra	
4633	That Old Fashioned Mother Of Mine		Joseph Phillips	
4634				
4635	Santa Claus Hides In Your Phonograph		Harry Humphrey	
4636	Valse Caprice		Victor Young, pno.	
4637				
4638				
4639	Who Knows?		Lewis James	
4640				
4641				
4642	Selection from "Il Trovatore"		Creatore & His Band	
4643	Kitty Donahue		Robert Denning	
4644				
4645				
4646				
4647	With Umpah Umpah On The Umpah Lake		Collins & Harlan	
4548				
4649	My Old Hawaiian Home		Palakiko's Hawaiian Orchestra	
4650	Say It While Dancing - Fox Trot		Broadway Dance Orc	
4651				
4652				
4653				
4654	Red Moon		E. L. Stevens, pno	
4655	Susie		Collins & Harlan	
4656				
4657				
4658	Poppies		Joseph Roberts, bjo	
4659				
4660	Rose of Bombay – Fox Trot		Wiedoeft's Californians	
4661				
4662				
4663				
4664				
4665	Cow Bells		Harry Raderman's Orc	
4666	Call Me Back, Pal O'Mine		Spencer & Hart	
4667				
4668	A Country Fiddler At The Telephone		Charles Ross Taggart	
4669				
4670				
4671				
4672	Look Down, Dear Eyes		Lewis James	
4673	Hesitation Waltz		E. Stevens' Trio	
4674	Nailed To The Cross		Mr. & Mrs. George Nhare	
4675	Only To See Her Face Again		Venetian Instrumental Qrt.	
4676	You Tell Her, I Stutter		Jones & Hare	
4677	Kiss Mama, Kiss Papa		Kaplan's Melodists	
4678				
4679	Fox Trot		Atlantic Dance Orc	
4680				
4681				
4682				
4683				
4684				
4685	Porters On A Pullman Train		Collins & Harlan	
4686				
4687				
4688				
4689	A Visit To Reilly's		Charles Reilly	
4690	Lonesome Mamma Blues		Fred Van Eps, bjo.	
4691				
4692				
4693				
4694				
4695	You Gave Me Your Heart		Broadway Dance Orchestra	
4696	Pal Of All Pals		Joseph Phillips	
4697				
4698				
4699				
4700				
4701	Red Moon Waltz		E. Stevens Trio	
4702	My Southern Home		Harry Raderman's Orchestra	
4703				
4704				
4705	La Paloma		Marta De La Torre & A. Valencia (Violin & Guitar)	
4706				
4707	Whistling		Al Burt's Dance Orchestra	
4708				
4709				
4709	Fate		Atlantic Dance Band	
4710				
4711				
4712				
4713				
4714				
4715	Creole Serenade		Rae Eleanor Ball, vin.	
4716	Tomorrow – Fox Trot		Ernest Stevens' Trio	
4717	My Dawg		Al Barnard	
4718	Jake The Sheik – Fox Trot		Atlantic Dance Band	
4719				
4720	Somewhere In Dixie		Shirley Spaulding, bjo	
4721				
4722	Open Your Arms, My Alabamy – Fox Trot		Kaplan's Melodists	
4723	Jennie		Steven's Quartet	
4724	My Cuban Pearl – Tango		Kaplan's Melodists	
4725	That Dixie Melody		Kaplan's Melodists	
4726				
4727				
4728				
4729				
4730	I 'm Yours With Love And Kisses		That Girl Quartet	
4731	Frolic Of The Coons		Fred Van Eps, bjo.	
4732	Now Wouldn't You Like To Know?		Collins & Harlan	
4733				
4734				
4735				
4736				
4737				
4738				
4739	Charlestown Blues		Kaplan's Melodists	
4740	The Pelican - Fox Trot		Kaplan's Melodist's	
4741				
4742				
4743	Runnin' Wild		Broadway Dance Orc	
4744	When Will The Sun Shine For Me?		Kaplan's Melodists	
4745	You've Got To See Mamma Ev'ry Night		Broadway Dance Orchestra	
4746				
4747	Beale Street Mamma		Broadway Dance Orchestra	
4748				
4749				
4750	Will There Be Any Stars?		Metropolitan Qrt	
4751				
4752				
4753				
4754				
4755				
4756				
4757	Barney Google		Jones & Hare	
4758				
4759				
4760				
4761				
4762				
4763				
4764	No One Loves You Better Than Your M-A-M-M-Y		Kerr's Orchestra	
4765	Silent Night		Elizabeth Spencer, J. Young, & V. Archibald	1920
4766	Love Cure – Valse Intermezzo		E. L. Stevens, pno.	
4767	Old King Tut (In old King Tutankhamen's day)	h. von tilzer	Billy Jones & Ernest Hare	1923
4768				
4769	A Kiss In The Dark		Kaplan's Melodists	
4770				
4771				
4772	Yes, We Have No Bananas - Fox Trot		Green Bros. Novelty Band	
4773	Carolina Mammy		Walter Scanlan	
4774	Benny! Be Yourself!		Green Bros. Novelty Band	1923
4775	Babe – Fox Trot		Atlantic Dance Band	
4776	night after night-fox trot		Dave Kaplans Melodists	1923
4777	That's My Baby		Denning & Holt	1923
4778	Yes, We Have No Bananas	Frank Silver & Irving Cohn	Billy Jones	1923
4779	That's my baby		M. J. O'Connell & Ed Smalle	1923
4780				
4781				
4782				
4783	The Old Rugged Cross		Helen Clark & R. Roberts	1922
4784				
4785				
4786				
4787				
4788				
4789				
4790				
4791				
4792				
4793	If You're The Same Tomorrow		James Stevens	
4794				
4795				
4796				
4797				
4798				
4799				
4800	Swingin' Down the Lane - Fox Trot	Isham Jones	P. Victorin's Orchestra	1923
4801	Oh, Harold!		Atlantic Dance Band	1923
4802	Ride Of The Valkyries		American Symphony Orchestra	1924
4803	Tannhäuser		Orphée Langevin	1924
4804	Waikiki Hawaiian Rainbow	Jeanne Gravelle & Bob Haring	Waikiki Hawaiian Orchestra	1924
4805	Dream Of The Tyrolienne		Venetian Instrumental Quartet	1924
4806	The Holy City		Hardy Williamson	1924
4807	Pretty Peggy - Fox-Trot		Creager's Dance Orchestra	1924
4808	Marcheta		McNalpak’s Dance Orchestra	1924
4809	Bonnie Sweet Bessie		Marie Narelle	1924
4810	Cut Yourself A Piece Of Cake		Billy Jones & Ernest Hare	1924
4811	Knice And Knifty [Piano Novelty] {Piano Solo}	Roy Bargy In Collaboration with Charly Straight	Ernest L. Stevens	1924
4812	Just A Girl That Men Forget		James Doherty	1924
4813	Roll Along, Missouri [Waltz]		McNalpak's Dance Orchestra	1924
4814	The Gold Digger (Dig A Little Deeper)		Billy Jones	1924
4815	Dreamy Melody [Medley Waltz]		McNalpak's Dance Orchestra	1924
4816	Menuett		Marta De La Torre	1924
4817	Marche Slave		Sodero's Band	1924
4818	Maritana		Marie De Kyzer & Vernon Archibald	1924
4819	Not issued			1924
4820	King Love!		Betsy Lane Shepherd	1924
4821	What Do You Do Sunday, Mary – Fox Trot		McNalpak's Dance Orchestra	1924
4822	"Deeze", "Doze" and "Dem"		Billy Jones	1924
4823	You've Simply Got Me Cuckoo		Kalpan's Melodists	1924
4824	It Ain't Gonna' Rain No Mo'		Wendell Hall	1924
4825	Mama Goes Where Papa Goes (Or Papa Don't Go Out Tonight)		Elsie Clark	1924
4826	Moonlight Kisses [Fox Trot]		Ernest Stevens' Trio	1924
4827	Samuel Johnson (Get Thee Gone From Here)		Al Bernard & Ernest Hare	1924
4828	Little Butterfly [Fox Trot]		Ernest Stevens' Dance Orchestra	1924
4829	Mammy's Little Silver Lining		Vernon Dalhart	1924
4830	Mama Loves Papa, Papa Loves Mama		Nathan Glantz & His Orchestra	1924
4831	Memory Isle		Homestead Trio	1924
4832	Easy Melody [Fox Trot]		Nathan Glantz & His Orchestra	1924
4833	31st Street Blues		Al Bernard & Frank M. Kamplain.	1924
4834	Stay Home, Little Girl, Stay Home		The Merry Sparklers	1924
4835	Cindy (It Am Wedding Time)		Al Bernard & Ernest Hare	1924
4836	Regret [Fox Trot]		Harry Lange's Parisian Dance Orchestra	1924
4837	Take A Look At Molly		James Doherty	1924
4838	Raggedy Ann [Fox Trot]		Broadway Dance Orchestra	1924
4839	So I Took The $50,000		Robert Denning	1924
4840	Tweet Tweet [Fox Trot]		Nathan Glantz and His Orchestra.	1924
4841	You're in Kentucky Sure As You're Born		Jones & Hare	1924
4842	Dancing' Dan [Fox Trot]		The Merry Sparklers	1924
4843	Mickey Donohue		James Doherty	1924
4844	In Love With Love [Fox Trot]		Broadway Dance Orchestra	1924
4845	Largo		American Symphony Orchestra	1924
4846	Madame Butterfly		Anita Rio	1924
4847	Casse-Noisette		Conway's Band	1924
4848	La Chère Maison		Paul Reimers	1924
4849	Cavatina		Madeleine Sokoloff, Igor Sokoloff & Robert Gaylor	1924
4850	Liebesleid {Violin}		Irma Seydel	1924
4851	The Volga Boatman's Song / The Charming Boy		Russian Balalaika Ensemble	1924
4852	Oft In The Stilly Night		Thomas Chalmers	1924
4853	Peer Gynt Suite No. 1		Sodero's Band	1924
4854	Faites-Lui Mes Aveux		Rosa Olitzka	1924
4855	I'm Goin' South [Fox Trot]		The Jazz-O-Harmonists	1924
4856	Tho' Shadows Fall		Helen Clark & Lewis James	1924
4857	Old-Fashioned Love		Broadway Dance Orchestra	1924
4858	The Thrill Of Love		Helen Clark & Joseph A. Phillips	1924
4859	Hula Lou [Fox Trot]		Nathan Glantz & His Orchestra	1924
4860	The Little Wooden Whistle Wouldn't Whistle		Billy Jones	1924
4861	An Orange Grove In California		Broadway Dance Orchestra	1924
4862	Finnegan's In Again		Robert Denning	1924
4863	That Old Gang Of Mine		Billy Jones & Ernest Hare	1924
4864	Maybe She'll Write Me (Maybe She'll Phone Me) [Fox Trot]		Broadway Dance Orchestra	1924
4865	Mindin' My Business		Ernest Hare	1924
4866	Limehouse Blues [Fox Trot]		Atlantic Dance Orchestra	1924
4867	Why Did I Kiss That Girl? [Fox Trot]		Tommy Monaco's Orchestra	1924
4868	Oh Boy, What Joy We Had In Bare Foot Days		Billy Jones	1924
4869	California, Here I Come [Fox Trot]		Atlantic Dance Orchestra	1924
4870	Mr. Radio Man (Tell My Mammy To Come Back Home)		Margaret A. Freer	1924
4871	Take A Little One-Step [Fox Trot]		The Merry Sparklers	1924
4872	Land Of My Sunset Dreams		Helen Clark & Charles Hart	1924
4873	The One I Love (Belongs To Somebody Else) [Fox Trot]		Harry Radioman's Orchestra	1924
4874	What Does The Pussy-Cat Mean When She Says "Me-Ow"?		Billy Jones & Ernest Hare	1924
4875	There's Yes! Yes! In Your Eyes [Fox Trot]		The Merry Sparklers	1924
4876	Me No Speak-A Good English		Billy Jones & Ernest Hare	1924
4877	Cuddle Me Up [Slow Fox Trot]		Kaplan's Melodists	1924
4878	A Smile Will Go A Long Way {Piano Solo}		Ernest L. Stevens	1924
4879	What'll I Do?		Betsy Lane Shepherd & Charles Hart	1924
4880	Wop Blues [Slow Fox Trot]		Georgia Melodians	1924
4881	It Looks Like Rain		Ernest Hare with ukulele acc. by Frank Ferera	1924
4882	Wait'll You See My Gal [Fox Trot]		Georgia Melodians	1924
4883	I Popped The Question To Her Pop		Billy Jones	1924
4884	Lonesome (As Can Be) [Fox Trot]		Harry Raderman's Orchestra	1924
4885	In The Evening		Vernon Dalhart & Ed Smalle	1924
4886	(Life And Love Seem Sweeter) After The Storm [Fox Trot]		Harry Radioman's Dance Orchestra	1924
4887	Pal Of My Dreams		Charles Hart	1924
4888	Tea Pot Dome Blues [Fox Trot]		Georgia Melodians	1924
4889	Little Pal Of Long Ago		Helen Clark & Charles Hart	1924
4890	Bringin' Home The Bacon [Fox Trot]		Kaplan's Melodists	1924
4891	Savannah (The Georgianna Blues) [Fox Trot]		Georgia Melodians	1924
4892	Down Where The South Begins		Billy Jones & Ernest Hare	1924
4893	Burning Kisses [Fox Trot]		Kaplan's Melodists	1924
4894	Paradise Alley [Fox Trot]		Harry Raderman's Dance Orchestra	1924
4895	Driftwood [Fox Trot]		Harry Raderman's Dance Orchestra	1924
4896	What Has Become Of Hinky Dinky Parlay Voo?		Al Bernard	1924
4897	When Katinka Shakes Her Tambourine		Nathan Glantz's & His Orchestra	1924
4898	The Wreck On The Southern Old 97		Vernon Dalhart	1924
4899	Monkey Doodle [Fox Trot]		The Merry Sparklers	1924
4900	Hard-Boiled Rose		Billy Jones & Ernest Hare	1924
4901	You'll Never Get To Heaven With Those Eyes		Atlantic Dance Orchestra	1924
4902	I'm Gonna Bring A Watermelon To My Girl Tonight		Billy Jones & Ernest Hare	1924
4903	Why Did You Do It? [Fox Trot]		Georgia Melodians	1924
4904	Boll Weevil Blues		Arkansas Trio	1924
4905	When It's Love Time In Hawaii [Waltz]		Waikiki Hawaiian Orchestra	1924
4906	Everything You Do [Fox Trot]		Harry Raderman's Dance Orchestra	1924
4907	Save A Kiss For Rainy Weather		Green Brothers' Novelty Band	1924
4908	Radio [Fox Trot]		Atlantic Dance Orchestra	1924
4909	A New Kind Of Man (With A New Kind Of Love For Me)		Arkansas Trio	1924
4910	There's No One Just Like You [Fox Trot]		Kaplan's Melodists	1924
4911	You Got Ev'rything A Sweet Mama Needs (But Me)		Ellen Coleman	1924
4912	Opera Reel w/calls {Violin}		Jasper Bisbee	1924
4913	She Walked Right Up And Took My Man Away		Ellen Coleman	1924
4914	The Old Red Barn Medley Quadrille {Violin}		John Baltzell	1924
4915	Cruel Back-Bitin' Blues		Ellen Coleman with Lem Fowler's Orchestra	1924
4916	McDonald's Reel {Violin}		Jasper Bisbee	1924
4917	You're Gonna Wake Some Morning, But Papa Will Be Gone		Ethel Finnie	1924
4918	Durang Hornpipe Medley {Violin}		John Baltzell	1924
4919	Red Hot Mama [Fox Trot]		Georgia Melodians	1924
4920	Ole Aunt Mandy's Chile		Criterion Quartet	1924
4921	The Pal That I Loved Stole The Gal That I Loved		James Doherty	1924
4922	June Night [Fox Trot]		Nathan Glantz & His Orchestra	1924
4923	The Dixie Kid		Criterion Quartet	1924
4924	Jealous		Frank Wright & Frank Bessinger (The Radio Franks)	1924
4925	It Had To Be You [Fox Trot]		Harry Raderman's Dance Orchestra	1924
4926	Charley, My Boy [Fox Trot]		Georgia Melodians	1924
4927	I Wonder What Has Become Of Sally [Fox Trot]		Broadway Dance Orchestra	1924
4928	A Street Corner Quartet		National Male Quartet	1924
4929	Georgia Lullaby		Helen Clark & Charles Heart	1924
4930	San [Oriental Fox Trot]		Georgia Melodians	1924
4931	Sally Lou [Fox Trot]		Broadway Dance Orchestra	1924
4932	Rose Marie [Fox Trot]		Broadway Dance Orchestra	1924
4933	When I Was The Dandy And You Were The Belle		Walter Scanlan	1924
4934	The World Is Waiting For The Sunrise {Pipe Organ}		Frederick Kinsley	1924
4935	It Ain't Gonna Rain No Mo'		Billy Jones & Ernest Hare	1925
4936	Arkansas Traveler [Breakdown] {Harmonica, Guitar & Dance Calls}		Gene Austin & George Reneau (The Blue Ridge Duo)	1925
4937	Memory Lane		Walter Scanlan	1925
4938	Rock-A-Bye My Baby Blues		Frank M. Kamplain	1925
4939	Let Me Call You Sweetheart (I'm In Love With You) [Waltz]		Harry Raderman's Dance Orchestra	1925
4940	Doodle-Do-Doo [Fox Trot]		Broadway Dance Orchestra	1925
4941	Where's My Sweetie Hiding? [Fox Trot]		Nathan Glantz & His Orchestra	1925
4942	Oh, You Can't An Old Hoss Fly		Billy Jones & Ernest Hare (The Happiness Boys)	1925
4943	Nightingale [Waltz]		Polla's Clover Gardens Orchestra	1925
4944	Ukulele Lou		Vernon Dalhart & Frank M. Kamplain	1925
4945	No One Knows What It's All About		Billy Jones & Ernest Hare (The Happiness Boys)	1925
4946	My Best Girl [Fox Trot]		Kaplan's Melodists	1925
4947	Big Bad Bill is Sweet William Now	Ager, Yellen	Ernest Hare	1925
4948	Back Where The Daffodils Grow [Fox Trot]		Green Brothers' Novelty Orchestra	1925
4949	Too Tired [Fox Trot]		Polla's Clover Gardens Orchestra	1925
4950	I Want To See My Tennessee		Dalhart & Smalle	1925
4951	Ain't You Comin' Out Tonight?		Vernon Dalhart & Company	1925
4952	Follow The Swallow [Fox Trot]		Atlantic Dance Orchestra	1925
4953	Tell Her In The Springtime [Fox Trot]		Broadway Dance Orchestra	1925
4954	The Prisoner's Song		Vernon Dalhart & Company	1925
4955	Way Out West In Kansas		Vernon Dalhart & Company	1925
4956	Jerry-Co	Harry Lauder	Glen Ellison	1925
4957	What A Smile Can Do		Billy Wynne's Greenwich Village Inn Orchestra	1925
4958	O Sole Mio {Unaccompanied Harp-Zither}		August Eckert	1925
4959	On My Ukulele (Tra La La La )		Billy Jones & Ernest Hare	1925
4960	Peter Pan (I Love You) [Fox Trot]		Billy Wynne's Greenwich Village Inn Orchestra	1925
4961	You Will Never Miss Your Mother Until She Is Gone		Gene Austin & George Reneau (The Blue Ridge Duo)	1925
4962	Dancing On The House Top {Banjo}		Fred Van Eps	1925
4963	How Do You Do?		Billy Jones & Ernest Hare	1925
4964	Blue-Eyed Sally [Fox Trot]		Billy Wynne's Greenwich Village Inn Orchestra	1925
4965	Oh Katharina! [Fox Trot]		Green Brothers' Novelty Band	1925
4966	I Hear You Calling Me		Ralph Errolle	1925
4967	You're Just A Flower From An Old Bouquet		Arthur Hall & John Ryan	1925
4968	Life's Railway To Heaven		Gene Austin & George Reneau (The Blue Ridge Duo)	1925
4969	I'll See You In My Dreams [Fox Trot]		Ace Brigode & His 14 Virginians	1925
4970	On The Village Green {Banjo}		Fred Van Eps	1925
4971	I'm Gonna Tramp! Tramp! Tramp!		Ernest Hare	1925
4972	The End Of The Road		Homer Rodeheaver	1925
4973	Little Brown Jug		Gene Austin & George Reneau (The Blue Ridge Duo)	1925
4974	Will You Remember Me? [Fox Trot]		Polla's Clover Gardens Orchestra	1925
4975	Lonesome Road Blues		Gene Austin & George Reneau (The Blue Ridge Duo)	1925
4976	Blue Ridge Blues		Gene Austin & George Reneau (The Blue Ridge Duo)	1925
4977	Turkey In The Straw [Breakdown] {Harmonica, Guitar & Dance Calls}		Gene Austin & George Reneau (The Blue Ridge Duo)	1925
4978	Susie Ann		Gene Austin & George Reneau (The Blue Ridge Duo)	1925
4979	The Fortune Teller Airs No. 2		New York Light Opera Company	1925
4980	Wedding March	Mendelssohn	American Symphony Orchestra	1925
4981	Walking Water Reel {Violin}		Allen Sisson	1925
4982	Beauty's Eyes		Thomas Chalmers	1925
4983	Drigo's Serenade		Harry Barth's Mississippians	1925
4984	I'll Take you home Again, Pal O'Mine	Harold Dixon & Claude Sacre	Walter Scanlan (Intro: Helen Clark in Refrain)	1925
4985	In A Monastery Garden		Peerless Orchestra	1925
4986	Mother Goose Songs No. 1		Lewis James	1925
4987	Mother Goose Songs No. 2		Lewis James	1925
4988	Coral Sands Of My Hawaii		Waikiki Hawaiian Orchestra	1925
4989	In Absence	Dudley Buck & Phoebe Cary	Weber Male Quartet	1925
4990	March Militare		United States Marine Band	1925
4991	Just For Tonight		Gregor Skolnik & His Orchestra	1925
4992	Erminie (At Midnight On My Pillow Lying)		Elizabeth Spencer	1925
4993	Rococo		Armand Vecsey & His Hungarian Orchestra	1925
4994	Indiana Moon [Waltz]		Harry Barth's Mississippians	1925
4995	Maritana ('Tis The Harp In The Air)		Elizabeth Spencer	1925
4996	The Fortune Teller Airs No. 1		New York Light Opera Company	1925
4997	Not issued			1925
4998	Poet And Peasant Overture {Unaccompanied Banjo}		Eddie Peabody	1925
4999	Titina		Billy Jones	1925
5000	In The Heart Of Hawaii		Waikiki Hawaiian Orc.	1925
5001				
5002				
5003				
5004				
5005	By The Waters Of Minnetonka		Mel Craig's Orchestra	
5006				
5007				
5008	Christofo Columbo		Billy Jones	
5009	The Midnight Waltz	Gus Kahn & Walter Donaldson	Jack Stillman's Orchestra	
5010	Don't Bring Lulu		Jones & Hare	
5011	In the Baggage Coach Ahead	Gussie L. Davis	Vernon Dalhart & Company	
5012				
5013	Many, Many Years Ago		Vernon Dalhart	
5014	Pearl Of Hawaii		Waikiki Hawaiian Orchestra	1925
5015	The Time Will Come		Vernon Dalhart	
5016				
5017	Moon Of Waikiki	Al. Bernard & Russel Robinson	Waikiki Hawaiian Orchestra	
5018				
5019				
5020				
5021				
5022				
5023				
5024				
5025				
5026	St. Mark 10 & Why Do You Wait?		Rev. S.P. Cadman, DD	
5027	Rovin' Gambler		Vernon Dalhart & Co.	
5028	The Runaway Train		Vernon Dalhart	
5029				
5030	A Waltz in the Moonlight and You	Alfred Solman, Mitchell Parish	Frederick Kingsley, Organ	1925
5031	Chicago Tribune March	W. P. Chambers	Sodero's Band	
5032	New River Train		V. Dalhart &Co.	
5033	Regimental Pride March	J. C. Heed	United States Marine Band	
5034				
5035	When They Ring The Golden Bells For You And Me		Charles Hart	
5036				
5037	Abide With Me		Fredrick Kinsley, org	
5038	Just A Little Drink		Tennessee Happy Boys	
5039				
5040	Row, Row, Rosie!		Mike Speciale's Orchestra	
5041				
5042	Revelation 21 & The Gate Ajar For Me	DD Metro Quartet	Rev S.P. Cadman	
5043				
5044				
5045	Oh, How I Miss You To-night		James Doherty	
5046				
5047				
5048				
5049	The Death of Floyd Collins	(w. Andrew Jenkins m. Irene Spain)	Vernon Dalhart & Co.	
5050				
5051	Silver Head		Polla's Clover Garden Orc.	
5052	She'll Be Coming 'Round the Mountain	(Traditional US)	Vernon Dalhart	
5053				
5054				
5055				
5056	Red Hot Henry Brown		Georgia Medolians	
5057	Jesse James		Vernon Dalhart and Company	
5058				
5059	The John T. Scopes Trial		Vernon Dalhart	
5060	The Old Grey Mare		Billy Janes & Ernest Hare	1929
5061				
5062	The Little Rosewood Casket		Vernon Dalhart	
5063				
5064	Cecelia		Billy Wynn's Greenwich Village Orchestra	
5065	The New Gaiety		Fred Van Eps, bjo.	
5066	Persiflage	W. T. Francis	Fred Van Eps, bjo., John. Burckhardt at the Piano	
5067	Southern Blues		F. Ferera & Paaluhi, Hawaiian gtrs.	
5068	St. Lewis Blues		F. Ferera & Paaluhi, Hawaiian gtrs.	
5069				
5070	Remember – Waltz		Jack Stillman's Orchestra	
5071	Christmas Morning At Clancy's		Porter & Jones	
5072				
5073	Old MacDonald Had A Farm (vocal)		The Sam Patterson Trio	
5074				
5075	I would Rather Be Alone In The South	Norman J. Vause	Billy Jones and Ernest Hare (The Happiness Boys)	
5076	Old Joe Clark		Fiddlin' Powers & Family	1925
5077	On A Slow Train Through Arkansas		Al Bernard	
5078	The Wreck Of The Shenandoah	Maggie Andrews	Vernon Dalhart and Company	
5079	The Church in the Wildwood		Apollo Quartet of Boston	
5080				
5081	Smilin' Through		Herbert Soman, vin	
5082				
5083	Nobody But Fanny		Florida Four	
5084				
5085				
5086	Roll 'Em Girls – Fox Trot & Song		The Florida Four	
5087				
5088	The Letter Edged In Black		Vernon Dalhart and Company	
5089				
5090	Show Me The Way To Go Home		Tennessee Happy Boys	
5091	Zeb Turney's Gal		V. Dalhart & Co.	1926
5092	Carolina Sweetheart		Jack Stillman's Orchestra	1926
5093				
5094	Ida Red		Fiddlin' Powers & Family	
5095				
5096	Mother's Grave		Vernon Dalhart & Chorus	
5097				
5098				
5099	Behind These Gray Walls	Carson J. Robison	Signing, Harmonica, Violin and Guitar Vernon Dalhart and Company	
5100	A Cup Of Coffee, A Sandwich and You Fox Trot		Mike Speciale's Carleton Terrace Orchestra	
5101				
5102	The Unknown Soldier's Grave		Vernon Dalhart & Co.	
5103				
5104	The Prancin', Dancin', Yodelin Man		Barnard & Kamplain	
5105	The Prisoners Song		Kaplan's Melodists	
5106				
5107				
5108				
5109				
5110				
5111	Too Many Parties and Too Many Pals		Metropolitan Entertainers	
5112				
5113	I Need Jesus		Homer Rodeheaver	
5114	My Lord's Gonna Move This Wicked Place		Hann's Empererors Of Song	
5115	(How I love her and she loves me is) Nobody's business	Gaskill-Mills	Billy Jones & Ernest Hare	1926
5116	Carry Me Back To Old Virginny		Kaplan's Melodists	1926
5117	Frank Dupree	Jenkins	Vernon Dalhart & Company	1926
5118	What did I tell ya? (That's her, that's her) — Fox trot		Mike Speciale & his Hotel Carlton Terrace Orchestra	1926
5119				
5120				
5121	Trumpet Blues		Donald Lindley, cnt	
5122	The Freight Wreck At Altoona		Vernon Dalhart & Co.	
5123	Sour Wood Mountain		Fiddlin' Powers & Family	
5124				
5125				
5126	I'll Take You Home Again, Kathleen		Kaplan's Melodists	
5127				
5128	When the Work's All Done This Fall		E.V. Stoneman	
5128	Sweet Hawaiian Dreams		Waikiki Hawaiian Orc	
5129	The Wild And Reckless Hobo		Charlie Powers of the Fiddlin' Powers Family	1926
5130				
5131	The Wild And Reckless Hobo		Charlie Powers	
5132				
5133	Always		Kaplan's Melodists	
5134	Sugar In The Gourd		Fiddlin' Powers & Family	1926
5135	The Engineer's Child		Vernon Dalhart	
5136	Thanks For The Buggy Ride		Earl Oliver's Jazz Babies	
5137				
5138				
5139				
5140	Always		Walter Scanlan	
5141				
5142	Just A Breath Of Hawaii		Waikiki Hawaiian Orc	
5143				
5144				
5145				
5146				
5147				
5148				
5149	Cumberland Gap		A. Sisson	1925
5150	Lightning Express		Vernon Dalhart	
5151	Silver Head		Polla's Clover Garden Orc.	
5152				
5153	Horses		Earl Oliver's Jazz Babies	
5154				
5155	The Old Oaken Bucket-waltz	woolworth	Kaplan's Melodists	1926
5156	Alabamy cradle song	Kahn-Otis-Van Alstyne	Sibyl Fagan Ensemble	1926
5157	Tamiami Trail	Friend-Santly	Dave Kaplan's Novelty Orchestra Vcl: James Doherty	1926
5158	Break the news to mother	Harris	Waikiki Hawaiian Orchestra	1926
5159	The Spanish Shawl		Georgia Melodians	1926
5160	After I Say I'm Sorry		Frank Braidwood	1926
5161	Roses — Fox trot	Britt-Tobias	Jack Stillman's Orchestra	1926
5162	That certain feeling — Fox trot	Gershwin-Gershwin; "Tip-Toes"	Nathan Glantz & his Orchestra (as Tennessee Happy Boys)	1926
5163	Don't Steal Daddy's Medal		Manuel Romain	
5164	Valencia		Jack Stillman's Orc w/ Charles Harrison, vc	
5165	Tie Me To Your Apron Strings Again Fox Trot	Joe Goodwin & Larry Shay	Tennessee Happy Boys vocal Refrain by Arthur Fields	1926
5166	Kentucky waggoner — Reel	Traditional	Allen Sisson (Champion Fiddler of Tennessee)	1926
5167	One Little Smile		Frank ferara and co. as the Hilo Serenaders	
5168	Onward, Christian soldiers	Sullivan-Baring-Gould	Calvary Choir & Choir Boys of St. Andrews Episcopal Church, NYC	1926
5169	Kitten On The Keys		Zez Confrey, pno.	1926
5170	Remember - Waltz		Jack Stillman's Orc.	
5171	The Jealous Lover Of Lone Green Valley		Vernon Dalhart	
5172	The Prisoner's Sweetheart		Charles Harrison	
5173	Where They Never Say "Goodbye"		Homer Rodeheaver & Chorus	
5174				
5175	The Ship That Never Returned		Vernon Dalhart & Co.	
5176	The Chain Gang Song		Vernon Dalhart	
5177				
5178	Bye Bye Blackbird		National Male Quartet	
5179				
5180	Hello, Aloha! How Are You?		Arthur Fields	
5181	Somebody's Lonely		Frank Braidwood	
5182				
5183				
5184	In The Middle Of The Night		Radio Franks	
5185	Hi-Diddle-Diddle		Jones & Hare	
5186	Sesqui- Centennial Exposition March		Sodero's Band	1926
5187	Bury Me Beneath The Weeping Willow Tree		Ernest V. Stoneman	
5188	When The Works All Done This Fall		Ernest Stoneman	
5189	Roses Remind Me Of You		B. A. Rolfe's Palais d'Or Orc	
5190				
5191	Watermelon Hanging On The Vine		Ernest Stoneman	
5192				
5193				
5194	John Henry		Ernest Stoneman	
5195	She's A Corn Fed Indiana Girl		Earl Oliver's Jazz Babies	
5196				
5197				
5198				
5199	When The Red Red Robin Comes Bob Bobin' Along		Frank Braidwood	
5200	Sinking Of The Titanic		Ernest Stoneman	
5201				
5202	My Dream OF THE BIG Parade		Arthur Fields	
5203				
5204				
5205				
5206				
5207				
5208				
5209	I'd Climb The Highest Mountain		Charles Harrison	
5210	Lucky Day		Duke Yellman's Orchestra	
5211	Glory Of The Yankee Navy March		Sousa's Band	1926
5212	The Day Is Dying In The West		Metropolitan Qrt.	
5213	Crazy Quilt		B. Rolfe's Palais d'Or Orchestra	
5214				
5215				
5216	Swing Low, Sweet Chariot (Negro Spiritual)		Fisk University Jubilee Quartet	
5217				
5218	The Picnic		Harry Lauder	
5219				
5220				
5221	Lonesome And Sorry		Rae Eleanor Ball, vin.	
5222				
5223				
5224	Looking At The World		Golden Gate Orc.	
5225				
5226	The Black Bottom		Stern's Bellclaire Orchestra	
5227	Drifting And Dreaming		Waikiki Hawaiian Orchestra	
5228				
5229				
5230	My Cutie's Due at Two to Two Today	(W.M. Albert Von Tilzer, Irving Bilbo, & Leo Robin)	Al Campbell & Jack Kaufman	
5231	Moonlight On The Ganges		Duke Yellman's Orc:	
5232	Billy Richardson's Last Ride		V. Dalhart	1926
5233				
5234	Nola		Ernie Anderson, bjo	
5235				
5236				
5237				
5238				
5239	There's A New Star In Heaven To-Night	Rudolph Valentino	Vernon Dalhart	
5240	An Old-Fashioned Picture		Vernon Dalhart	
5241				
5242				
5243				
5244				
5245	O Gladsome Light & Th Lord's Prayer		Fifth Avenue Presbyterian Church Choir	
5246				
5247				
5248	Hum! Hum! Hum! Hum Your Troubles Away		National Male Qrt.	
5249				
5250				
5251	Because I Love You		Charles Harrison	
5252	A Little Music In The Moonlight		Four Aristocrats	
5253				
5254				
5255	Star of the East		Calvary Choir	
5256				
5257				
5258	McGregor's Toast		Harry Lauder	
5259				
5260	Don't Let The Deal Go Down		Vernon Dalhart	
5261				
5262	I'd Love To Call You My Sweetheart		Jonny Marvin	
5263				
5264				
5265				
5266				
5267				
5268	Hello, Bluebird		Vaughn De Leath	
5269				
5270				
5271				
5272				
5273	Roll, Jordan, Roll		Fisk University Jubilee Qrt.	
5274				
5275				
5276				
5277				
5278	I'm The Man That Rode The Mule Around The World		Vernon Dalhart	
5279				
5280				
5281	Because I Love You		Don Voorhees Vanities Orchestra	
5282	Just A Bird's Eye View		National Male Qrt.	
5283	Can I Sleep In Your Barn Tonight, Mister		Vernon Dalhart	
5284				
5285				
5286				
5287				
5288				
5289				
5290				
5291				
5292				
5293				
5294				
5295				
5296				
5297	Hand Me Down My Walking Cane		Ernest Stoneman & Dixie Mountaineers	
5298	Broken Hearted Melody		Waikiki Hawaiian Orc	
5299	Blue Skies		Don Voorhees Vanities Orc.	
5300				
5301				
5302				
5303				
5304	Valeeta Waltz		Henry Ford's Old Time Dance Orchestra	
5305				
5306				
5307				
5308	We Courted In The Rain		Ernest Stoneman	
5309				
5310				
5311				
5312	Blue Skies		Vaughn De Leath	
5313				
5314	The Bully Of The Town		E. V. Stoneman	1927
5315	Oh Bury Me Not On The Lone Prairie	(w. E.H. Chapin m. George N. Allen)	Vernon Dalhart	
5316	Mary Lou		Fred Kinsley, pipe org.	
5317				
5318				
5319				
5320	As It Began To Dawn		Edison Mixed Qrt	
5321	Get Away, Old Man, Get Away		V. Dalhart	1927
5322				
5323	In A Little Spanish Town ('Twas On A Night Like This)	Wayne-Lewis-Young	Arthur Fields	
5324	Lay My Head Beneath a Rose	Falkenstein-Madison	Charles Harrison	
5325	Crazy Words, Crazy Tune		Golden Gate Orchestra	1927
5326				
5327				
5328	The Great Camp Meeting		Fisk University Jubilee Qrt.	
5329	Me Too – Fox Trot		Golden Gate Orchestra	
5330				
5331				
5332				
5333	Ain't She Sweet?		C. Doerr's Orchestra	
5334	I'm Looking Over A Four Leaf Clover		Oreste And His Orchestra	1927
5335	The Scotch Errand Boy		Harry Lauder	
5336				
5337				
5338	Two Little Orphans		Ernest Stoneman	
5339				
5340	Golden Slipper Melody		Henry Ford's Old-Time Dance Orc.	
5341	Kitty Wells		E. V. Stoneman	1927
5342	The Long Eared Mule		The Dixie Mountaineers	1927
5343				
5344				
5345				
5346				
5347				
5348				
5349	In The Land Where We'll Never Grow Old		Sam Patterson Trio	
5350	The Tattooed Man – Selections		Victor Herbert's Orchestra	
5351	Killiecrankie		Harry Lauder	
5352	The Mockingbird (Violin)	John Baltzell	Champion Old Time Fiddler	
5353				
5354				
5355				
5356	Lucky Lindy		Vernon Dalhart	
5357				
5358				
5359	The Doll Dance Fox Trot		B. A. Rolfe and his Palais d'Or Orchestra	
5360				
5361				
5362	Lindbergh (The Eagle Of The USA)		Vernon Dalhart	
5363				
5364	Jean McNeil		Harry Lauder	
5365				
5366				
5367				
5368				
5369				
5370	Fifty Million Frenchman Can't Be Wrong		Jack Kaufman	
5371	Nesting Time		Clyde Doerr's Orc.	
5372				
5373				
5374				
5375	Picture's From Life's Other Side		Sam Patterson Trio	
5376				
5377				
5378				
5379				
5380				
5381				
5382				
5383	Bright Sherman Valley		Ernest V. Stoneman	
5384				
5385				
5386				
5387				
5388				
5389	Moonbeam, Kiss Her For Me		Markel's Orc.	
5390				
5391				
5392				
5393				
5394	The Wreck of the Number Nine		Vernon Dalhart	
5395	The Mississippi Flood		Vernon Dalhart	
5396				
5397				
5398	Ballet Music from "Le Cid"		Victor Hubert's Orchestra	
5399				Have 33
5400				
5401	It's A Million To One You're In Love		Kaplan's Happiness Orc:	
5402				
5403	Honolulu Home Sweet Home		Aloha Land Serenaders	
5404				
5405	At Sundown (When Love is Calling Me Home) Fox Trot		Al Lynn's Music Masters Vocal Chorus by J. Donald Parker	
5406				
5407				
5408				
5409				
5410				
5411				
5412	Wal, I Swan! (Or Ebeneezer Frye)	(w.m. Benjamin Hapgood Burt)	Al Bernard	
5413	When The Moon Shines Down Upon The Mountain		Vernon Dalhart	
5414	My Blue Ridge Mountain Home	Carson Robison	Vernon Dalhart & Carson Robison	
5415				
5416				
5417	A pretty fair miss		Fiddlin' Powers & Family	1925
5418	What Do We Do On A Dew-Dew-Dewey Day		Clyde Doerr's Orc.	1927
5419	Hawaiian Rose	Armstrong-Klickmannn	Frank Ferera & Company (as Palakiko's Hawaiian Orchestra)	1927
5420	Dawning — Fox trot	Silver-Pinkard)	California Ramblers (as Golden Gate Orchestra)	1927
5421	The Rocky Road To Dinah's House		Fiddlin' Power Family	
5422				
5423				
5424				
5425	The Referee		Harry Lauder	
5426				
5427				
5428				
5429				
5430	My Blue Heaven Fox Trot	George Whiting & Walter Donaldson	Al Friedman And His "Yoeng's" Orchestra Vocal Refrain By Vaughn DeLeath	
5431				
5432				
5433				
5434				
5435				
5436				
5437	In Jail		Two Dark Knights	
5438				
5439	Sing On, Brother, Sing		V. Dalhart & C. Robinson	1928
5440				
5441				
5442				
5443				
5444	I'll Be With You When The Roses Bloom Again		Walter Scanlan	
5445	Good News		D. Kaplan's Happiness Orc.	
5446	Charmaine Waltz		Joe Green And His Novelty Marimba Band	
5447				
5448	Baby Feet Go Pitter-Patter		Irwin Abram's Orchestra	
5449	Pullman Porters		Two Dark Knights	
5450				
5451				
5452				
5453	A Boy's Best Friend Is His Mother		Bud Thompson	
5454	Drunken Sailor Melody- Reels		John Balzell. vin.	
5455				
5456				
5457				
5458				
5459	My Carolina Home		V. Dalhart & Co.	1928
5460	O! Dem Golden Slippers		Vernon Dalhart	
5461				
5462				
5463				
5464	Among My Souvenirs Fox Trot	Leslie and Nicholls	B. A. Rolfe and His Palais D'or Orchestra	
5465				
5466				
5467				
5468	Highways Are Happy Ways Fox Trot		11 Peser's Pounders	
5469				
5470	My Blue Heaven		Vaughn De Leath	
5471				
5472				
5473				
5474				
5475				
5476	Henry's Made a Lady Out of Lizzie	Billy Jones & Ernest Hare		
5477	Courtin' The Widow		Willard Hodgin	1928
5478				
5479				
5480				
5481	Mule Mileage		Two Dark Knights	
5482	Among My Souvenirs	(w. Edgar Leslie m. Horatio Nicholls)	Charles W. Harrison	
5483				
8484				
5485				
5486				
5487				
5488				
5489				
5490				
5491				
5492				
5493				
5494				
5495				
5496	Let A Smile Be Your Umbrella		L. Lillienfeld's Biltmore Orchestra	1928
5497				
5498				
5499				
5500				
5501				
5502	Baby Your Mother Like She Babied You		Walter Scanlan	
5503	The Red-Headed Widow Was The Cause Of It All		Willard Hodgin	
5504				
5505				
5506				
5507				
5508				
5509				
5510				
5511				
5512				
5513	My Ohio Home		Louis Lilienfeld With His Hotel Biltmore Orchestra	1928
5514				
5515				
5516				
5517				
5518				
5519				
5520	Frankie and Johnny		Billy Jones	
5521				
5522				
5523				
5524				
5525				
5526				
5527				
5528				
5529				
5530				
5531				
5532				
5533				
5534				
5535				
5536				
5537				
5538				
5539				
5540				
5541				
5542				
5543				
5544				
5545				
5546	Laugh, Clown, Laugh		Arthur Fields	
5547				
5548				
5549				
5550				
5551	Get Out And Get Under The Moon		Frankie Marvin, uke	1928
5552				
5553				
5554				
5555				
5556				
5557				
5558				
5559				
5560				
5561				
5562				
5563				
5564	Six Feet of Earth		F. Luther & C. Robinson	
5565				
5566				
5567				
5568				
5569				
5570				
5571	Blue Yodel		F. Wallace	1928
5572	Little Green Valley		Luther & Robison	
5573	The Prisoner's Lament		Ernest Stoneman	
5574				
5575				
5576				
5577				
5578				
5579				
5580				
5581				
5582				
5583	Take Up Thy Cross	(A. H. Ackley )	Baritone and mixed voices	
5584				
5585				
5586				
5587				
5588				
5589				
5590	That's My Weakness Now		Jack Kaufman's Seven Blue Babies	1928
5591	Mr. Hoover & Mr. Smith		Jones & Hare	1928
5592				
5593				
5594				
5595				
5596				
5597				
5598				
5599				
5600				
5601				
5602				
5603				
5604				
5605				
5606	Jeannine I Dream Of Lilac Time		McAlpineers	
5607				
5608				
5609				
5610				
5611				
5612				
5613				
5614	Who Said I Was A Bum?		Frank Luther & his Pards	
5615				
5616	Jack Of All Trades		Frank Luther & his Pards	
5617				
5618				
5619	A Mother's Dying Wish		Pop Collins & His Boys	
5620				
5621				
5622				
5623				
5624				
5625				
5626				
5627				
5628				
5629				
5630				
5631				
5632				
5633				
5634				
5635				
5636				
5637	Jeannine I Dream Of Lilac Time		Vaughn De Leath ( The Radio Girl & Her Buddies	
5638				
5639				
5640				
5641	Polly Wolly Doodle		Vernon Dalhart	
5642	You're the Cream to My Coffee		Golden Gate Orchestra	
5643				
5644				
5645				
5646				
5647				
5648				
5649				
5650				
5651				
5652	Big Rock Candy Mountain	(Traditional US)	Vernon Dalhart	
5653				
5654				
5655				
5656				
5657				
5658				
5659				
5660				
5661				
5662				
5663				
5664				
5665				
5666				
5667	Wedding Bells Are Breaking Up That Old Gang of Mine	(w. Irving Kahal & Willie Raskin m. Sammy Fain)	Billy Murray & Walter Scanlan	
5668				
5669				
5670				
5671				
5672				
5673				
5674				
5675				
5676				
5677				
5678				
5679				
5680				
5681				
5682				
5683				
5684	I Faw Down An' Go Boom		Arthur Fields & His Assassinators	
5685				
5686				
5687				
5688				
5689				
5690				
5691				
5692				
5693				
5694				
5695				
5696				
5697				
5698				
5699				
5700				
5701				
5702				
5703				
5704				
5705	Two Gun Cowboy		Frankie Marvin & his Guitar	
5706				
5707				
5708	Waiting For Train		Jimson Brothers	1929
5709				
5710				
5711				
5712				
5713	my sin-fox trot	De Sylva-Brown-Henderson	California Ramblers (as Golden Gate orch,)	1929
5714	Honey — Fox trot	Simons-Gillespie-Whiting	California Ramblers (as Golden Gate Orchestra)	1929
5715	Blue Hawaii — Waltz	Baer-Caesar-Schuster	B. A. Rolfe & his Orchestra	1929
5716	Kansas City Kitty		Billy Murray's Merry Melody Men	
5717	Every Moon's A Honeymoon		Rollickers	
5718	Heaven help a sailor on a night like this	(Dubin-Raskin-Burke)	Jack Kaufman (as Jack Dalton)	June 1929
5719	If I had you	(Shapiro-Campbell-Connolly)	John Gart (Loew's Valencia Theater Organ)	October 1929
9225	Den Store, Hvide Flok	Norwegian	Otto Clausan	
9228	Bor Jeg Paa Det Hoje Fjeld	Norwegian	Otto Clausen	
9229	Eg Ser Deg Ut For Gluggin	Norwegian	Otto Clausen	
9235	Ingrids Vise & Kom Med Visor	Norwegian	Rolf Hammer	
9242	Ola Glomstulen & Kjemreise Saetren	Norwegian	Carsten Woll	
9247	Gamble Norge	Norwegian	Carsten Wolf	
9252	Sommersol Til Siste Stund	Norwegian	Carsten Wolf	
9426	Norriandingens Hemiangtan	Swedish	Arvid Asplund	
9427	Hvad Jag Har Lofvat Det Skall Jag Halla	Swedish	Ingeborg Laudon	
9433	Bref Fran Lina Parson	Swedish	Arvid Paulson	
9434	Grisamas Far	Swedish	Arvid Paulson	
9842	National Song of Denmark	Swedish	New York Military Band	
9845	National Air of Sweden	Swedish	New York Military Band	
9456	Fageina Visa	Swedish	Joel Mossberg	
9860	Lvi Solou Pochod	Bohemian	Bohumir Kryl & His Band	
9862	Orly Polskie	Bohemian	Bohumir Kryl & His Band	
9864	Jako Matka & Verne Milovani	Bohemian	Hanna Foerster & Bohumil Ptak	
9865	Nestastny Safaruv & Vsecko Jedno Je	Bohemian	Bohumil Ptak	
9866	Mne Darovalo Prstynek & Sedela Cikanka	Bohemian	Bohumil Ptak	
10046	Wedding Bells		Stanley Kirkby	
11226	Glada Na Lusch	Russian	Emanuel Hollander	
11232	Kalinka	Russian	Alexander Sashko	
14206	Crugybar	Welsh	National Welsh Mixed Qrt	
14212	Aberystwyth	Welsh	National Welsh Mixed Qrt	
22043	Causerie - Vals Lento	Mexican	Luis G. Rocha, vic	
22046	Lindas Mexicanas	Mexican	Banda de Policia de Mexico	
22055	Bagatelle	Mexican	Rita Villa, harp	
22074	Octaviano Yanez, gtr	Mexican	Anna	
22116	El Jardinero	Mexican	Abrego & Picazo	
22121	Merci	Mexican	Arriaga & Yanez, mandolin & gtr.	
22127				
22137	Cadetes Del 47	Mexican	Banda de Policia de Mexico	
22171	El Bailecito		A. Gobbi	
22427	Luce Mia!	Mexican	Daddi	
23001	Poet And Peasant Overtures	British	National Military Band	
23002	Thora	British	Peter Dawson	
23003	Roamin' In The Gloamin'	British	Harry Lauder	
23004	Poppies And Wheat	British	Olly Oakley, bjo.	
23005	Take A Pair Of Sparkling Eyes	British	Ernest Pike	
23006	Keep On Swinging Me, Charlie	Long-Scott, British	Florrie Forde	
23007	Off I Went To Doctor		Jack Charman	
23008	March, Strathspey & Reel	British	Highlanders Bagpipe Band	
23009	Come Along, Be One Of The Boys		Stanley Kirkby	
23010	The Kangaroo Hop	Godfrey & Williams	Billy Williams	
23011	Fight The Good Fight		Williamson & Kinniburgh	
23012	My Heart Is With You Tonight		Hardy Williamson	
23013	The Bells Of St. Malo		Nation Military Band	
23014	The Singer Was Irish		Peter Dawson	
23015	I Must Go Home Tonight		Billy Williams	
23016	The Broken Melody(Van Biene)	British	Jean Schwiller, vic.	
23017	Breakfast In Bed	British	Harry Lauder	
23018	Muleteer Of Malaga		T. F Kinniburgh	
23019				
23020	Regimental Marches #3		National Military Band	
23021	Valse Triste		National Military Band	
23022	A Wee Hoose 'Mang The Heather		Harry Lauder	
23023	When I Survey The Wonderous Cross		Williamson & Kinniburgh	
23024	My Young Man is Not the Chocolate Soldier	Fred Godfrey and Billy Williams	Billy Williams	
23025	The Choristers Waltz		Alhambra Orc	
23026	The Volunteer Organist		Peter Dawson	
23027	Little Willie's Woodbines		Billy Williams	
23028	The Death Of Nelson		Ernest Pike	
23029	Medley of Irish Airs	British	Alexander Prince, concertina	
23030	My Boy		Florrie Forde	
23031	Burial Of Sir John Moore	British	Bransby Williams	
23032	Yes, Let Me Like A Soldier Fall		Hardy Williamson	
23033	Why Do You Keep Laughing At Me?		Stanley Kirkby	
23034				
23035				
23036				
23037	Wille's Gane Tae Melville Castle		Thomas Kinniburgh	
23038	The Wibbly, Wobbly Walk		Jack Charman	
23039	Tell Her I Love Her So		Charles Compton	
23040	New Colonial March	British	National Military Band	
23041	Praeludium		National Military Band	
23042	Wait Till I Am As Old As Father	British	Billy Williams	
23043	Evening Breeze		National String Qrt.	
23044	The Miner's Dream Of Home		Peter Dawson & Mixed Quartet	
23045	A Dream Of Paradise		Hardy Williamson	
23046	The Yacht I've Not Got		Billy Merson	
23047	Mister Cupid		Stanley Kirkby	
23048				
23049	Come Into The Garden, Maud		Charles Compton	
23050	Hark! Hark! My Soul	Smart & Faber, British	Williamson & Kinniburgh	
23051	Keep Straight Down The Road		Florrie Forde	
23052	The Old Rustic Bridge	British	E. Pike & P. Dawson	
23053				
23054	The Ragtime Yokel		Jack Charman	
23055	Nazareth (Concertina)		A. Prince	
23056	Alice, Where Art Thou?	British	Ernest Pike	
23057	The Deathless Army	British	T. F. Kinniburgh	
23058				
23059	The Kilty Lads	Milligan and Lauder	Harry Lauder	
23060	Here, There and Everywhere March	British	National Military Band	
23061				
23062	Sally In Our Alley		Charles Compton	
23063	I Do Like You Susie		Stanley Kirkby	
23064				
23065	Carmen-Toreador Song	British	Peter Dawson	
23066				
23067	Jesus, Lover Of My Soul		Hardy Williamson & Thomas Kinniburgh	
23068				
23069	Patricia		Florrie Forde	
23070	It's Mine When You've Done With It		Billy Williams	
23071	In Sheltered Vale		T.F. Kinniburgh	
23072	The Moon Has Raised Her Lamp Above		Pike & Dawson	
23073	She's The Lass For Me		Harry Lauder	
23074				
23075	I Want To Be Down Home In Dixie, from "She Knows Better Now"		Collins & Harland	
23076	Les Deux Pigeons (The Two Pigeons)		National Military Band	
23077	Beside You		G. Hughes Macklin	
23078	The Ragtime Wedding		Billy Williams	
23079	The Athol Highlanders March	British	Highlanders Bagpipe Band	
23080	I Loved You More Than I Knew	Albert Ketèlbey	Charles Compton	1913
23081	The Butterfly (Concertina)	British	A. Prince	1913
23082				
23083	In Gay Paree		Jack Charman	
23084	The Bandolero		Peter Dawson	
23085				
23086				
23087	Parted		G. Hughes Macklin	
23088	On Her Pic-Pic-Piccolo		Billy Williams	
23089	A Dinder Courtship		T. F. Kinniburgh	
23090	In The Island Of Go As You Please		Jack Charman	
23091	Excelsior		Pike & Dawson	1910
23092	Dear Love Remember Me		Charles Compton	
23093	'Tis A Story That Shall Live Forever		Stanley Kirkby	1913
23094	The Gay Cavalier		Billy Merson	1913
23095				
23096	Bells Of London March	British	National Military Band	
23097	Your World Is My World		Hardy Williamson	
23098	Sandy, Take Hold Of My Hand		Daisy Taylor	
23099	I Wish I Were Back In Lancashire	Fred Godfrey	Billy Williams	1913
23100	Be Kind to the Loved Ones at Home	J. B. Woodbury	Charles Compton	
23101	A Ragtime Honeymoon		Stanley Kirkby	
23102				
23103	Sing Me To The Gloaming		T.F. Kinniburgh	
23104	Where Shall We Go Tonight?		Jack Charman	
23105	Salome – Intermezzo	W. Loraine – British	National Military Band	
23106				
23107	Farewell In The Desert		Hughes Macklin	
23108	All The Girls Are Lovely By The Seaside		Jack Charman	
23109	I'm Coming Back To Bonnie Scotland		Daisy Taylor	
23110	The Call Of The Homeland		T.F. Kinniburgh	
23111	The Merry Widow Waltz from "The Merry Widow"		Alexander Prince, concertina	
23112	Don't Play That Old Love Melody		Hardy Williamson	
23113	She Does Like A Little Bit Of Scotch		Billy Williams	
23114	Little Miss Demure		Stanley Kirkby	
23115				
23116	Overture Oberon		National Military Band	
23117	Macushia		Hughes Macklin	
23118	Hold Your Hand Out, Naughty Boy		Florrie Forde	
23119	Jocelyn-Berceuse		Jean Schwiller, vic.	
23120	Shipmates O'Mine		Thomas Kinniburgh	
23121				
23122	The Dollar Prince Waltz, from "The Dollar Prince"		Alhambra Orchestra	
23123	Make Up Your Mind, Maggie Mac Kenzie		Daisy Taylor	
23124				
23125	Eileen Alannah		Macklin & Brazell	
23126	I Do Love You, My Orange Girl		Jack Charman	
23127	Queen Of The Earth		Peter Dawson	
23128	Forgotten Melodies		Alexander Prince, concertina	
23132	Love Could I Only Tell Thee		Charles Compton	
23133	All The Ladies Fell In Love With Sandy		Billy Williams	
23134	Come Sing To Me		Sergeant C. Leggett	
23135				
23136	Christmas Awake		Male Qrt.	
23137	Christmas Song		Hughes Macklin	
23138				
23139	The Awakening Of Scrooge		Bransby Williams	
23140	The Dawn Of Light		Male Qrt.	
23141	Christmas Time		Jack Charman	
23142	Yuletide Memories		National Military Band	
23143				
23144	The Mistletoe Bough		Male Qrt.	
23145	The Star Of Bethlehem		Hardy Williamson	
23146	Why Don't Santa Claus Bring Something To Me?		Billy Williamson	
23147	Nazareth (Gounod)		Peter Dawson	
23148	The Street Watchman's Christmas		Bransby Williams	
23149	While Shepherd's Watch'd		Ernest Pike	
23150				
23151				
23152	Land Of Delight		Hughes Macklin	
23153	Jean Loves All The Jockeys		Bransby Williams	
23154	My Word		Stanley Kirkby	
23155	I Want You Near	British	Charles Compton	
23156	On The Banks Of Allan Water		Macklin & Brazell	
23157	Aisha- Indian Intermezzo		London Concert Orc.	
23158	Matrimonial Handicap		Jack Charman	
23159	"Roses" from "The Rose of Shiraz		Hardy Williamson	
23160	The Old Plaid Shawl		Thomas F. Kinniburgh	
23161	Oh Molly Mac Intyre		Billy Williams	
32162	Polish Dance # 1		National Military Band	
23163	Just Like Bein' At Hame		Harry Lauder	
23164	I Am A Roamer		Peter Dawson	
23165				
23166	Oh Sing To Me The Auld Scotch Songs		William Davidson	
23167				
23168				
23169	The Irish Emigrant		Stanley Kirkby	
23170	Selection from "The Gondoliers"		National Military Band	
23171	Bedouin Love Song	British	David Brazell	
23172	The Green Eye Of God	British	Bransby Williams	
23175	Come Back To Erin	British	Ernest Pike & Peter Dawson	1913
23176	Bonnie Scotland	Concerntina	Alexander Prince	
23178	Bonnie Scotland	British	Alexander Prince, concertina	
23180	Merry Widow Lancers	British	National Military Band	1914
23195	The Bullfighters March	British	National Military Band	
23200	The Better Land (Cornet)	British	Sgt. Charles Leggett	1914
23202	Blame It On To Poor Old Father		Billy Williams	
23213	Hey, Ho, Can't You Hear The Steamer?			
23216	Her Bright Smile Haunts Me Still	British	Macklin & Brazell	
23227	Somewhere A Voice Is Calling	British	Hughes Macklin	
23236	I'm Out For The Day Today	British	Billy Williams	1914
23238	Bonjour Chichinettes March	British	National Military Band	1914
23245	Somewhere A Voice Is Calling		Moss-Squire Celeste Orc.	
23248				
23249	Ballet Egyptian No. 2	Alexandre Luigini	National Military Band	
23252	The Worst Of It is I Like It	British	Billy Williams	
23263	Up From Somerset		S. Kirkby	
23269	Ballet Egyptian, No 4	British	National Military Band	
23271	Le Long du Missouri	British	National Military Band	
23278	Mary (Kind And Gentle is She)	British	Macklin & Brazell	
23279	What Time Tomorrow Night?	British	Billy Williams	
23280	The Flash Of Steel March	British	National Military Band	
23282	The Little Grey Home In The West	British	Hughes Macklin	
23289	Goodbye Ragtime		Billy Williams	1914
23291	Ballet Russe No.1 Czabdas	British	National Military Band	
23322	Snappy Stories		Bobbie Naish	1914
23328	Regimental Marches – No 1, Brigade of Guards	British	National Military Band	
23338	The Admiral's Broom	British	Peter Dawson	
23340	Our Troops	British	National Military Band	
23342	Gems of Ireland		National Military Band	1914
23345	The Flying Squadron	British	National Military Band	
23358	Onaway, Awake Beloved	British	Robert Howe	
23375	Land Of My Dreams And You		Walter Van Brunt	
23380	Love Is The King Of Everything	British	Reed Miller	1915
23398	Spring's Awakening		Mary Carson	
23399	Sailing On The Good Ship Sunshine	British	Irving Kaufman	
26019	Der Freischutz-Ansprache des Eremiten	German	F. Browler & Carl Nebe	
26029	Festmarch	German	Johann Strauss Orc	
26050	Flotte Bursche-Ouverture	German	Johann Strauss Orc	
26052	Mit Schwert Und Lanze Marach	German	Johann Strauss Orc	
26059	Marche Militaire	German	Johann Strauss Orc	
26061	Sonst Spielt' Ich Mit Szepter, Aus Zar Und Zimmermann	German	C. Van Hulst	
26067	Stille Nacht, Heilige Nacht	German	Steidl Quartet	
26093	Armee Marche # 168	German	Johann Strauss	
26102	Am Meer	German	Elite Qrt.	
26110	Lohengrin-Gott Gruss euch	German	Theodor Lattermann	
26120	Tannhauser-Ansprache des Landgrafen	German	Theodor Lattermann	
26133	Wohlauf Noch Getrumken	German	Max Kuttner	
26136	Nar Dasseine Bit, from "Der Beltelstudent"	German	Max Kuttner	
26150	Der Waffenschmied-Der Waffenschmied	German	Eduard Lichtenstein	
26171	Es Ist Bestimmt In Gottes Rat	German	John Frederick	
26178	O Schone Zeit, O Sel'ge Zeit	German	Emma Loeffler	
26179				
26180	Soviel Stern Am Himmel Stehen	German	John Frederich	
26181	Tief In Bohmerwald	German	Harvey Hindermeyer	
27006	Les Lanciers (3 & 4)		Garde Républicaine	1918
27039	Bouquet De Valses		Garde Républicaine	1918
27042	Louise-Depuis le Jour	French	Berthe Lowelly	
27048	Express Orient - Galop Imitatie	French	Garde Républicaine	1918
27074	Carmen-Chanson du Toreador	French	Louise Dupouy	
27089	Des Dragons De Villars	French	Garde Republicaine Band	
27130	Le Cald-Air du Tambour Major	French	Paul Payan	
27131	Si Tu M'Aimais (Denza)	French	Louis Dupouy	
27134	Comme A Ving Ans!	French	Paul Dufault	
27196	Le Moulin De Maitre Jean	French	Torcom Bezazian	
27214	Jinga-Bula-Jing-Jing	French	Hector Pellerin	
27218	Murmures D'Amour	French	Hector Pellerin	
28101	Tales Of Hoffman - Barcarole	Classical & Operatic	Marie Rappold & Thomas Chalmers	
28102	Thais - Meditation	Classical & Operatic	Albert Spalding, vin.	
28103	Ben Bolt	Classical & Operatic	Eleanora De Cisneros	
28104	One Sweetly Solemn Thought		Thomas Chalmers	
28105	Hymn To The Emperor	Haydn- Classical & Operatic	Olive Mead String Qrt	
28106	Ava Maria (Gounod)	Classical & Operatic	Rappold & Spalding, vin.	
28107	Love's Old Sweet Song	Classical & Operatic	Christine Miller	
28108	Believe Me If All Those Endearing Young Charms	Thomas Moore	Anna Case	
28109	Angel's Serenade	Classical & Operatic	Margaret Keyes	
28110	I Hear You Calling Me	Charles Marshall	Orville Harrold	
28112	The Snowy Breasted Pearl	Classical & Operatic	Orville Harrold	
28113	II Trovatore - Ah si ben mio	Classical & Operatic	Ricardo Martin	
28114	Cavalleria Rusticana - Voi lo sapete	Classical & Operatic	Maria Labia	
28116	La Gioconda-Cielo e mart		Carlo Albani	
28117	Der Freischutz-Wie nahte mir der Schlummer		Marie Rappold	
28118	Thais - Alexandrial	Classical & Operatic	Giovanni Polese	
28119	Tannhauser-O du mein holder Abendstern		Fritz Feinhals	
28120	Die Ich Schiitt Es Gem In Alle Rinden Ein (Schubert)		Heinrich Knote	
28121	Maskenball- Pagenarie		Melittia Hein	
28122	La Boheme - Mi chiamano Mimi		Lucrezia Bori	
28123	La Sonnambula-Come per me sereno		Maria Galvany	
28124	Die Meistersinger - Preislied		Heinrich Knote	
28125	Mignon- Je suis Titania	Classical & Operatic	Blanche Arral	
28126	Prophete - Ah! mon fils!	Classical & Operatic	Maria Deina	
28127	L'Africana O Paradiso!	Classical & Operatic	Carlo Albani	
28128	Afton Water		Christine Miller	
28129	Mary	Classical & Operatic	Orville Harrold	
28130	Ballo in Maschera-En tu che macchiavi		Ernesto Caronna	
28131	I Pagliacci-Che volo d'angelli!		Margueritia Sylva	
28132	Martha-M'appari		Aristodemo Giorgini	
28133	Rigoletto- L'aria di Gilda	Classical & Operatic	Selma Kurz	
28134	I Pagliacci-Prologo		Carlo Galeffi	
28135	Orfeo ed Euridice - Che faro sense Euridice	Classical & Operatic	Marie Deina	
28136	Romeo et Juliette – Ah, leve toi soleil	Classical & Operatic	Gaston Du Bois	
28137	Tosca - Vissi d'arte, vissi d'amour	Classical & Operatic	Adelina Agostinelli	
28138	La Traviata-De miel bollenti spiriti		Elvino Ventura	
28140	Otello-Morte d'Otello		Florencio Constantino	
28142	Nocturne in E Flat, Op 9, No. 2, (Chopin)	Frédéric Chopin	Katheen Parlow, vin.	
28143	Old Folks At Home (Foster)	Classical & Operatic	Margaret Keyes	
28145	Home, Sweet Home	Classical & Operatic	Eleonora De Cisneros	
28146	La Tossca -E lucevan le stelle		Leo Slezak	
28147	Barbiere di Siviglia - Una voce poco fa	Classical & Operatic	Selma Kurz	
28148	II Trovatore – II balen del suo sorriso	Classical & Operatic	Carlo Galeffi	
28149	Voci di Primavera ( J. Strauss)		Melitta Heim	
28151	Samson et Dalila – Mon Coeur s'oeuvre	Classical & Operatic	Marie Delna	
28152	Tannhauser-Blick ich umber		Walter Soomer	
28153	La Tosca-Non la sospiri la nostra casetta		Maria Labia	
28154	Tannhauser – O, Kehr' zuruck	Classical & Operatic	Fr. Egenieff	
28155	Martha – Lost, proscribed	Classical & Operatic	Hackett & Chalmers	
28156	The Flowers That We Love & Mariette	Classical & Operatic	Armand Vecsey's Hungarian Orchestra	
28157	Elijah - O rest in the Lord	Classical & Operatic	Christine Miller	
28158	Cavalleria Rusticana- Siciliana	Classical & Operatic	Riccardo Martin	
28159	La Traviata - Addio del passato	Classical & Operatic	Adelina Agostinelli	
28161	Aida-Celeste Aida	Classical & Operatic	Florencio Constantino	
28162	Lucia di Lammermoor - Aria del follia	Classical & Operatic	Selma Kurz	
28163	Souvenir of Moscow – Russian Airs (Wieniawski)	Classical & Operatic	Albert Spalding, vin.	
28164	Kathlean Mavourmean		Thomas Chalmers	
28165	O Promise Me		Marie Rappold	
28166	Annie Laurie		Christine Miller	
28167	Good-Bye (Tosti)		Riccardo Martin	
28169	The Sweetest Story Ever Told		Orville Harrold	
28170	Simplicius Waltz, Op 427	Johann Strauss	Armand Vacsey's Hungarian Orc,	
28171	Agnus Dei	Bizet	Marie Rappold	
28172	Good Bye, Sweet Day	Classical & Operatic	Christine Miller	
28173	Rondo, Op 94	Dvorak	Paulo Gruppe, vic	
28174	Pagliacci - Prologue		Thomas Chalmers	
28175	Sing, Smile, Slumber		Marie Rappold	
28176	O Happy Day, O Day So Dear		Margaret Keyes	
28178	Abide With Me		Christine Miller	
28179	Come Back To Erin		Orville Harrold	
28180	O Wert Thou In The Cauld Blast	Mendelsson	Eleonora De Cisneros & Paulo Gruppe, vic	
28181	Coppelia - Entr Acte & Waltz		Vacsey's Orc	
28182	La Favorita - Angel of Light		Orville Harrold	
28183	Cavaileria Rusticana-Mother you know the story		Marguerita Syiva	
28185	The Swan (Saint-Saens)		Albert Spalding, vin.	
28187	Lohengrin-Elsa's Traum		Marie Rappold	
28190	Rigoletto - Caro nome		Anna Case	
28192	Menuett in G Flat Major (Beethoven & Valse Bluette (Drigo)		Kathleen Parlow, vin.	
28193	The Last Rose Of Summer		Marie Rappold	
28194	The Lawn Swing	Classical & Operatic	Christine Miller	
28195	Faust-All hail thou dwelling pure and lowly		Paul Althouse	
28197	Trovatore-Miserere	Classical & Operatic	Case & Althouse	
28198	Martha – None So Rare		Paul Althouse	
28199	Pascatori di Perie - Mi par d'udir ancora		Aristedemo Giorgini	
28200	Lolita-Spanish Serenade		Redferne Hollinshead	
28201	Parted		Redferme Hollinshead	
28202	Just For Today		Christine Miller	
28203	II Trovatore - Home to our mountains	Classical & Operatic	Keyes & Beddoe	
28207	The Bedouin Love Song		Arthur Middleton	
28208	My Ain Countrie		Christine Miller	
28210	O Lord, Be Merciful	Classical & Operatic	Marie Rappold	
28212	Stabat Mater - Inflammatus		Marie Rappold	
28213	I'll Sing Thee Songs of Araby		Paul Althouse	
28214	Good Bye		Anita Rio	
28216	Carmen - The toreador song		Thomas Chalmers	
28217	Elisir d'Amore - Una furtiva lagrima		Karl Jorn	
28219	Messiah - There Were Three Shepherds & Glory Be To God		Anita Rio	
28220	Jocelyn - Berceuse		Herman Sandby, vic	
28222	Benvenuto Cellini- De l'art spiendeur immortelle		Orphee Langevin	
28225	Son and Stranger- I am a roamer bold		Arthur Middleton	
28226	Fora del Destino -Madre, pietosa vergine		Julia Heinrich	
28228	Mad'le Ruck, Ruck, Ruck	Classical & Operatic	Karl Jorn	
28230	Messiah - I Know that my Redeemer liveth		Julia Heinrich	
28231	The Messiah-The trumpet shall sound		Arthur Middleton	
28232	Messiah - Hallelujah Chorus		Oratorio Chorus	
28233	Whispering Hope		Rappold & Miller	
28234	La Traviata-Lorsqu' a de folles amour		Orphee Langevin	
28236	My Old Kentucky Home- Variations		Albert Spalding, vin.	
28237	Faust-Air des bijoux		Alice Verlet	
28238	Attila - Praise ye		Rappold, Jorn & Middleton	
28239	Semele- Where'er you walk		Redferme Hollinshead	
28242	Wenn Die Schwalben Helmwarts Zieh'n		Rappold & Urlus	
28247	Scots, Wha Has Wi' Wallace Bled		Christine Miller	
28250	Dormi Pure		Thomas Chalmers	
28251	Weiss ich Dich in Meiner Naha		Rappold & Urlus	
28252	Sing Me To Sleep		Christine Miller	
28253	I Pagliacci-Vesti la glibba		Guido Ciccolini	
28256	Carry Me Back To Old Virginny		Thomas Chalmers	
28258	Gloria	Buzzi - Peccia	Arthur Middleton	
28259	Aida - La fatal pietra		Rappold & Zenatello	
23260	Old Folks At Home		Anna Case	
28261	Annie Laurie		Anna Case	
28265	Father O'Flynn		Arthur Middleton	
28269	Serenade	Drdla	Mary Zentay, vin.	
28270	Home Sweet Home		Anna Case	
28271	We'd Better Bide A Wee		Christine Miller	
28273	Lucia di Lammermoor- Fra poco a me ricovero		Guido Ciccolini	
28274	Le Coeur et la Main-Pardonne, et ne sois pas faches		Le Fontenay & Langevin	
28275	On The Road To Mandalay	Classical & Operatic	Henri Scott	
28278	Madama Butterfly-Amore o grillo		Ciccolini ^& chalmars	
28279	Battle Hymn Of The Republic		Thomas Chalmers	
28280	Three Fishers		Arthur Middleton	
28281	Scenes de la Csarda-No8, Azt Mondjak		Mary Zentay, vin.	
28282	O Solo Mio		Guido Ciccolini	
28284	Sunshine Song		Julia Heinrich	
28286	The Gypsy Trail		Arthur Middleton	
28290	Le Coeur et la Main-Par toi, divine creature		Le Fontenay & Langevin	
29001	Rigoletto- Questo o guella & La donna e mobile	Purple Amberola Series	Alessandro Bonci	
29003	Fausi - Saive dimora	Purple Amberola Series	Alessandro Bonci	
29006	Rigoletto Bella figlia dell' amore	Purple Amberola Series	Verlet, Alcock, Coccolini & Middleton	
29007	Aloha Oe		Frieda Hempel & the Criterion Qrt.	
29008	Sing Me To Sleep		Christine Miller	
29013	Theme & Variations (Proch)		Frieda Hempel	
29016	The Ninety and Nine	Purple Amberola Series	Christine Miller	
29017	The Americans Come!		Arthur Middleton	
29022	Come Where My Love Lies Dreaming	Purple Amberola Series	Anna Case & the Criterion Qrt	
29024	Mireille-Mon Coeur ne peut changer		Anna Case	
29025	Any Place Is Heaven If You Are Near Me		Thomas Chalmers	
29027	Cavalloria Rusticana - Ave Maria	Purple Amberola Series	Frieda Hempel	
29028	Love's Old Sweet Song		Marie Rappold	
29030	Emmet's Lullaby		Freida Hempel &the Criterion Qrt.	
29032	Finiculi Funicula		Guido Ciccolini	
29034	The Daughter Of The Regiment-Evviva la Francia		Frieda Hempel	
29036	Stabat Mater- Quis est homo?	Purple Amberola Series	Verlet & Matzenauer	
29037	The Chase- Hunting Song		Arthur Middleton	
29039	Smilin' Through		Thomas Chalmers	
29040	O Holy Night	Purple Amberola Series	Frieda Hempel	
29041	How Fair Art Thou		Arthur Middleton	
29043	Tell Me The Old, Old Story		Arthur Middleton	
29045	Heaven Is My Home		Thomas Chalmers	
29047	La Cid-O Souverain, O Juge, O Pere		P. A. Asselin	
29048	O Divine Redeemer		Marie Rappold	
29049	La Favorita- Vian Leonore		Taurino Parvis	
29051	Life's Dream is O'er		Rappold & Lazzari	
29053	Kentucky Babe		Frieda Hempel & Lyric Male Quartet	
29054	Red Rose, from "Monsieur Beaucaire"		Arthur Middleton	
29056	The Want Of You		Thomas Chalmers	
29057	Love's Sorrow		Carolina Lazzari	
29065	Manon-La reve		P.A. Asselin	
29069	Long, Long Ago		Frieda Hampel	
29071	In Mezzo Al Mare		Mario Laurenti	
29073	Sonata in G Minor (Marcello)-Largo		Maurice Marechal, vic	
29076	By The Waters Of Minnetonka & Lullaby	Purple Amberola Series	Frieda Hempel	
29077	Nina (The last issue in the Purple Amberol series)		Mario Laurenti	
SPECIAL J	The Hermit's Bell Overture		Orchestra	

== See also ==
- Blue Amberol Records
