= Mary Carson =

- Carson in 1915, published in Musical America
- Born: February 5, 1876; Millican, Texas, U.S.
- Died: August 21, 1951 (aged 75); Houston, Texas, U.S.
- Other name: Kathleen Kingston
- Education: New England Conservatory
- Occupations: Operatic soprano; Opera director; Voice teacher; Impresario

Mary Carson, also known as Mary Carson Kidd, (February 5, 1876 – August 21, 1951) was an American soprano, opera director, and voice teacher. She had an active performance career from 1899 into the 1920s. A native of Texas, she grew up in Houston. Trained at the New England Conservatory and with private teachers in Italy, she first worked as a concert soprano in the United States, England, and Italy until making her opera debut at the Teatro Sociale in Pallanza in 1908. She sang in operas in Italy for the next four years.

Carson was a recording artist for Edison Records among other labels during the 1910s, making records both as herself and under the pseudonym Kathleen Kingston. She worked as a principal soprano for the Century Opera Company in New York City from 1913 to 1915 and with the Boston Grand Opera in 1916. She also toured with the Aborn Opera Company and Giuseppe Creatore's opera company. She performed with American orchestras under conductors such as Victor Herbert, Ralph Lyford, and Oscar Spirescu, including performances at Carnegie Hall. She returned to Houston frequently during her career to give recitals, usually with her brother, the composer, pianist, and conductor Aldridge Kidd, as her accompanist.

Carson was active as an opera impresario and director in Houston during the 1920s and 1930s. By 1924 she had opened a private voice studio in Houston. She was appointed head of the voice department at the Houston Conservatory of Music in 1936 and taught there until at least 1941. Ill health forced her into retirement in the later years of her life.

== Biography ==
=== Early life and studies at the New England Conservatory ===
The daughter of George Kidd and Katherine Bledsoe Aldridge, Mary Carson Kidd was born on February 5, 1876, in Millican, Texas. Her father worked as an accountant and auditor for the Houston and Texas Central Railway. Her mother was a patron of the arts in Houston, and also founded and was principal of a school in that city known as the Young Ladies' and Children's Institute. One of her brothers was the pianist, conductor, and composer Aldridge Kidd.

Carson studied singing at the New England Conservatory (NEC). Both she and her brother Aldridge were studying there simultaneously as early as 1896. She was a member of the NEC's chapter of the music fraternity Alpha Chi Omega. Her voice teacher at NEC was William L. Whitney. She graduated from the NEC in June 1899, earning a Bachelor of Music in Voice. She performed the coloratura soprano aria "Ombre légère" from Meyerbeer's opera Dinorah at the commencement ceremony, and was handed her diploma by George Whitefield Chadwick. In November 1899 she gave her first public recital in Houston at Bryan Hall with her brother as her accompanist.

=== Early career and studies in Europe ===
Carson in Paris, 1908

In May 1900 Carson sang the mad scene from Donizetti's opera Lucia di Lammermoor at the 23rd annual German-Texas Saengerfest held in Austin, Texas, and gave a recital at Phoenix Hall in Dallas sponsored by the Dallas Quartet Club. She soon after traveled to Europe to continue her music education, arriving there in August 1900. Her aunt Clara Aldridge accompanied her. She studied music in Florence, and returned to Houston in the autumn of 1901. Shortly after this she served as the first music director of the Womans' Choral Club of Houston which was founded in 1901. She conducted the group's first concert, which was given at Bryan Hall in April 1902, and was later a guest soloist with this chorus in April 1907.

In September 1902 Carson gave a farewell recital in Houston with her brother before departing for another study period abroad in Europe. She studied with Mario Braggiotti in Florence, and made her debut recital there in March 1904 at the Palazzo di De Fabris at 83 Via Ghibellina. A month earlier she had sung at a "musicale" held in the Florence home of soprano Irma Wright-Heims where she appeared with fellow performers including baritone Vittorio Carpi, Norina Bellincioni (daughter of Gemma Bellincioni), and Clara Clemens (daughter of Mark Twain). Other teachers she studied with in Italy included Isadore Vraggiotti, Rafaele del Ponte, and Adolgesa Moffi.

By July 1904 Carson was in England where she sang in a private concert given at Swan House, Chelsea Embankment, under the auspices of Princess Christian of Schleswig-Holstein. The following month she was a featured soloist in a concert at the Bideford Public Rooms with a local critic writing "possessing a voice of peculiar sweetness and power, Miss Kidd, in many of her efforts enthralled her hearers, the audience following almost breathlessly the exquisite gradations of her voice in the more tender passages of her songs." In September 1904 she performed a benefit concert at Barnstaple Music Hall to raise funds for the North Devon Infirmary on Litchdon Street in Barnstaple. She was a soloist in a London concert sponsored by the Freemasons in March 1905.

By August 1905 Carson was back in the United States where she performed a concert at the New Ocean House in Swampscott, Massachusetts. In November 1905 she was a guest soloist with the Washington Saengerbund at the New National Theatre in Washington D.C. In December 1905 she gave a concert at Madison Hall on the campus of the University of Virginia sponsored by The Arcadians music and dramatic club. In the press it was reported at this time that she had moved to New York City. In November 1906 she sang at an event organized by the American Playgoers at the Hotel Astor in Manhattan. She returned to Texas to give a recital with her brother at the Houston Theater on April 4, 1907 which was enthusiastically reviewed in the local press. This was followed by another recital later that month at the Hancock Opera House in Austin.

=== Opera career and other performances ===
Carson in 1915

Carson made her opera debut in 1908 at the Teatro Sociale in Pallanza, Verbania, Italy, as Amina in La sonnambula. In 1909 she appeared at the Teatro Alessandro Bonci in Cesana as Norina in Donizetti's Don Pasquale, and at the Teatro Galletti in Domodossola as Rosina in Rossini's The Barber of Seville. Other engagements in Italian provincial theaters followed as Marguerite in Gounod's Faust and Gilda in Verdi's Rigoletto. She returned to Houston in December 1909 to give a concert at the recently built Prince Theatre. She sang Rosina again for her debut in Milan in 1910 at the theatre of the Kursaal Diana. That same year she appeared at the Teatro Fossati in Milan as Norina, and gave concerts in several provincial Italian towns.

In 1911 Carson sang the dual roles of Jane and Jebbel in Alberto Franchetti's Germania at the Teatro Amilcare Ponchielli in Cremona, and gave her first performance at the Teatro Regio in Turin replacing an ailing singer as Amina in Bellini's La sonnambula. In early 1913 she was back in New York City studying singing with tenor J. H. McKinley. In 1913 and 1916 she toured the United States as a prima donna with the Aborn Opera Company. In the summer of 1913 Carson sang a concert with Victor Herbert and his orchestra at the music festival held at the Skidmore School of Arts, also performing with that orchestra as a soloist in Coleridge-Taylor's oratorio The Song of Hiawatha.

On November 16, 1913, Carson sang excerpts from Verdi's La traviata in a concert at the Century Opera House in New York. She gave her first performance in a staged opera in New York on Thanksgiving Day 1913 with the Century Opera Company (COC) as Gretel in Humperdinck's Hansel and Gretel with Kathleen Howard as the Witch and Carlo Nicosia conducting. She was committed to the COC for the 1913–1914 season with her other repertoire with that company including Gilda in Rigoletto and the title role in Massenet's Cendrillon. In December 1914 she gave a recital at Houston's City Auditorium with a portion of the proceeds being given to aid the poor in Houston as distributed by mayor Ben Campbell.

In January 1915 she gave a recital at Houston City Auditorium attended by a minimum of 2000 people. In March 1915 she gave her first recital in New York at Aeolian Hall with pianist André Benoist. She toured to Boston with the COC in 1915 to perform the role of Gretel at the Boston Opera House with Maggie Teyte as Hansel and Ralph Lyford conducting. That same year she was a soloist with the Schubert Chorus led by Arthur Henry Turner at the Springfield Municipal Auditorium. In 1916 she sang with Boston Grand Opera and gave a recital tour with pianist George Roberts and tenor John Finnegan.

In 1917 Carson was a soloist at Carnegie Hall singing "Inno di Garibaldi" under conductor Oscar Spirescu. In 1918 she performed in a special concert at the Wanamaker Auditorium, New York City, with members of the cast of Yip Yip Yaphank and fellow soloists Marie Sundelius and Riccardo Martin. In the summer of 1919 she was a soloist with the Lewisohn Stadium Symphony Orchestra, including singing Luigi Arditi's famous vocal waltz Il bacio" with conductor Arnold Volpe to a crowd of approximately 8,850 people. She also toured with Giuseppe Creatore's opera company in 1919 as Gilda with Giorgio Puliti as Rigoletto.

=== Recording artist ===
Carson sings "The Kiss" ("Il bacio") by Luigi Arditi and Gottardo Aldighieri. Edison Records, 1915.

Carson made a couple of early recordings with Victor Talking Machine Company in 1912–1913. She came under contract with Edison Records with whom she made classical music recordings as Mary Carson and popular entertainment recordings as Kathleen Kingston. An early successful recording for her was "Oh Dry Those Tears" (1912, Edison). She remained active with the company until at least 1915.

Carson sued Thomas Edison in 1917 over refusal to pay her. Carson's contract with Edison had been made through his manager, a Mr. Fuller, who had made a standard recording contract with Carson rather than hiring her on the terms Edison had instructed Fuller to follow. Edison argued that the contract was not enforceable because Fuller had not followed his instructions. Carson won the court case which was concluded in her favor in a ruling by Learned Hand. In August 1917 she made a couple of recordings with Brunswick Records.

=== Opera impresario and teacher ===
In 1921 Carson performed with the De Feo Opera Company in Houston, both managing the company and starring in productions of Rigoletto and The Barber of Seville. The company was reformed as the Mary Carson Opera Company in 1922. It presented seven operas that year under Carson's direction with her brother serving as the company's opera chorus director. In 1925–1926 she organized and produced a season of light operas at the City Auditorium in Houston. From 1930 to 1933 she directed and organized opera productions in Houston such as Leoncavallo's Pagliacci, Gounod's Roméo et Juliette and Faust, and Bizet's Carmen, some of which were supported financially by the Foley's department store.

By 1924 Carson was working as a music teacher in Houston, but continued to perform in recitals in that city with her brother until as late as 1929. She originally operated a private voice studio at 808 Polk Ave. in Houston. In 1933 she moved to new premises in Westmoreland, Houston. In 1936 she was appointed head of the voice department at the Houston Conservatory of Music. She taught there for several years, and was still on the vocal music staff of the conservatory as late as 1941. At some point after this ill health forced her into retirement.

=== Death ===
Carson died in Houston on August 21, 1951, at the age of 75.
