= List of operas set in the Crusades =

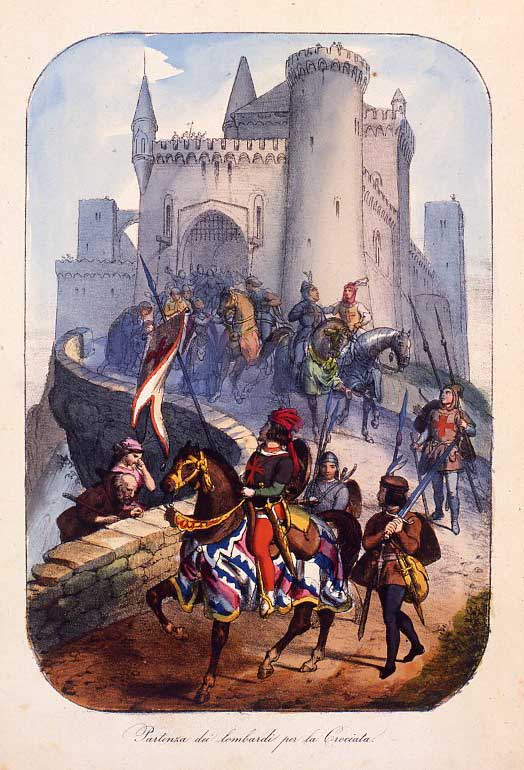
The Lombards departing for the First Crusade from I Lombardi alla prima crociata by Tommaso Grossi. Grossi's epic poem formed the basis for Verdi's opera I Lombardi alla prima crociata.

Operas set against the background of the medieval Crusades can be found in the earliest examples of the art form and continue to be written into the 21st century. Many of the works listed here contain characters and plots based on real or legendary figures of the time such as Tancred, Prince of Galilee, Godfrey of Bouillon or Jaufre Rudel. The majority are set, at least in part, in the Holy Land and the surrounding region and deal with the conflicts between the Christians and Muslims. Others, such as Donizetti's Gabriella di Vergy, deal with the misadventures of knights returning from the Crusades. In the case of Gabriella di Vergy, Raoul de Coucy returns from the Third Crusade to find that his beloved Gabriella has married Lord Fayel. Following a duel, Fayel cuts out the heart of the unfortunate Raoul and presents it in an urn to Gabriella. The only comedy in the list, Rossini's Le comte Ory, recounts the attempts by Ory and his friends to seduce the Countess of Formoutiers and the women of her household while their men are away at the Crusades. Ory's ploy of dressing up as nuns to gain access to the women is foiled when the Crusaders return. Many of the libretti for the operas listed are based either directly or indirectly on Torquato Tasso's epic poem, La Gerusalemme liberata (Jerusalem Delivered), or on Voltaire's tragic play, Zaïre.

== Literary sources ==
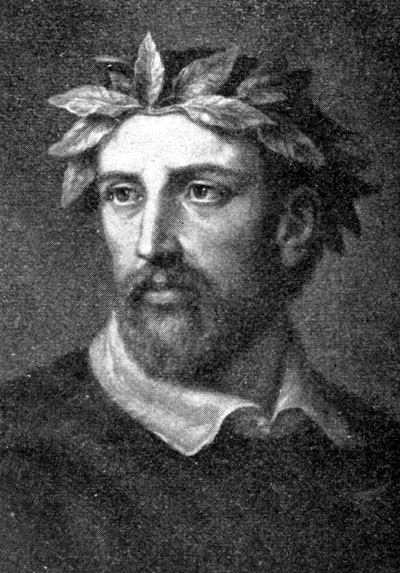
Torquato Tasso, the author of La Gerusalemme liberata. His tortured life was itself the subject of an opera – Donizetti's Torquato Tasso.

Torquato Tasso's 1581 epic poem La Gerusalemme liberata and Voltaire's 1732 play, Zaïre were the sources for the majority of operas in this list and are described in more detail below. Other literary works which have served as the basis for operas on the Crusades include: Niccolò Forteguerri's 1735 mock epic poem, Il Ricciardetto; Dormont De Belloy's 1777 play, Gabrielle de Vergy; Jean-Antoine-Marie Monperlier's 1813 play Les Chevaliers de Malte (The Knights of Malta); August von Kotzebue's 1820 play Die Kreuzfahrer (The Crusaders); Sir Walter Scott's 1825 novel, The Talisman; and Tommaso Grossi's 1826 epic poem I Lombardi alla prima crociata (The Lombards in the First Crusade).

=== Tasso's La Gerusalemme liberata ===
At least one hundred operas have been inspired by Tasso's La Gerusalemme liberata (Jerusalem Delivered). He began writing it while still a schoolboy and finished it in 1575 when he was thirty. The first complete editions were published in Parma and Ferrara in 1581. The main characters are a mixture of historical figures and ones invented by Tasso. Of the poem's main characters below, the invented Rinaldo and Armida, are the most frequent operatic characters. Their love story, primarily recounted in Canto XVI, is one of the most famous episodes in La Gerusalemme liberata and has alone served as the theme for over fifty operas as well as many paintings. Apart from Tancredi, the historically based characters tend to have relatively minor roles in operas based on the poem.

Goffredo is Godfrey of Bouillon, one of the military leaders of the First Crusade and later ruler of Jerusalem. (The original title of La Gerusalemme liberata was Il Goffredo.)

Pietro l'eremita is Peter the Hermit, the spiritual leader of The People's Crusade.

Tancredi is Tancred, Prince of Galilee, a Norman knight who became the ruler of Galilee and Antioch. He and Gaston IV of Béarn claimed to be the first Crusaders to enter Jerusalem when the city fell on 15 July 1099. In the poem, Tancredi falls in love with Clorinda and in turn is loved by both Clorinda and Erminia.

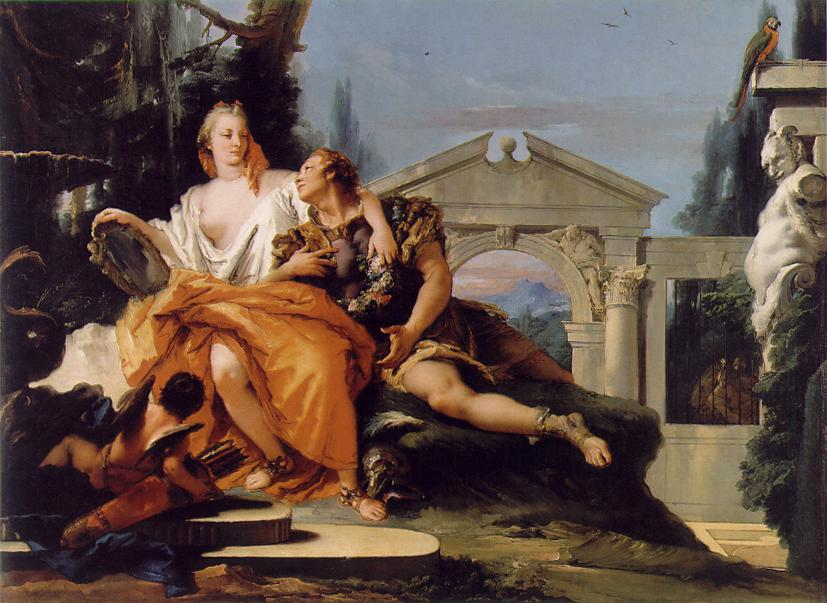
Rinaldo falls under Armida's spell in a painting by Giovanni Battista Tiepolo, one of his many works inspired by their story.

Rinaldo (fictional) is a valiant Christian knight. In the story, he is an ancestor of the House of Este, a compliment paid to Tasso's patron Alfonso II d'Este the Duke of Ferrara. Rinaldo shares the name (but not the identity) of an earlier Christian knight, Rinaldo di Montalbano who was a character in Ariosto's Orlando Furioso. After escaping Armida's enchantment, he seeks penance on the Mount of Olives for having abandoned his Christian duty for love and participates in the final assault on Jerusalem.

Armida (fictional) is a beautiful highborn woman from Damascus and a sorceress. Her grandfather (Idraote), the ruler of the city was also a sorcerer. She uses her beauty and her magic to enchant the Christian knights and sow discord amongst them. After spiriting Rinaldo away to her magic isle, they fall in love. When Rinaldo comes to his senses and leaves her to return to battle, she becomes suicidal. Her character has elements of both Homer's Circe and Ariosto's Alcina.

Erminia (fictional) is the daughter of the Muslim King of Antioch (Cassano) who was killed by the Crusaders when they conquered the city. Tancredi nevertheless treats her with honour and protects her, causing Erminia to fall in love with him. When Tancredi is wounded in battle and on the verge of death, she abandons her people and comes over to the Christian side, curing him with special herbs.

Clorinda (fictional) is a warrior-princess, fighting on the side of the Muslims. Unbeknownst to her, she is actually the daughter of the Christian King of Ethiopia. She was born white, an extraordinary fact attributed to her having been conceived beneath a painting of Saint George. Fearing that the dark-skinned King would not believe this explanation, Clorinda's mother had the child taken to Egypt by her servant (Arsete), where she was raised a Muslim. Clorinda and Tancredi fall in love, but ultimately meet in battle during the final assault on Jerusalem, although they don't recognize each other beneath their armour. Clorinda is killed by Tancredi, and dying in his arms asks him to baptize her.

Sofronia and Olindo (fictional) are young Christian lovers living in Jerusalem before its fall to the Crusaders. When the Muslim ruler of the city, Aladino, orders a persecution the Christians, they are sent for execution. Clorinda takes pity on them and rescues them as they are about to be burnt at the stake.

Argante (fictional) is a hot-headed Saracen warrior and an emissary of the King of Egypt and King Aladino. He is eventually slain by Tancredi.

Ismene (fictional) is a powerful sorcerer in the service of King Aladino. At one point Ismene convinces Aladino to steal an icon of the Virgin Mary and hang it in a mosque, where he can cast a spell on it.

=== Voltaire's Zaïre ===
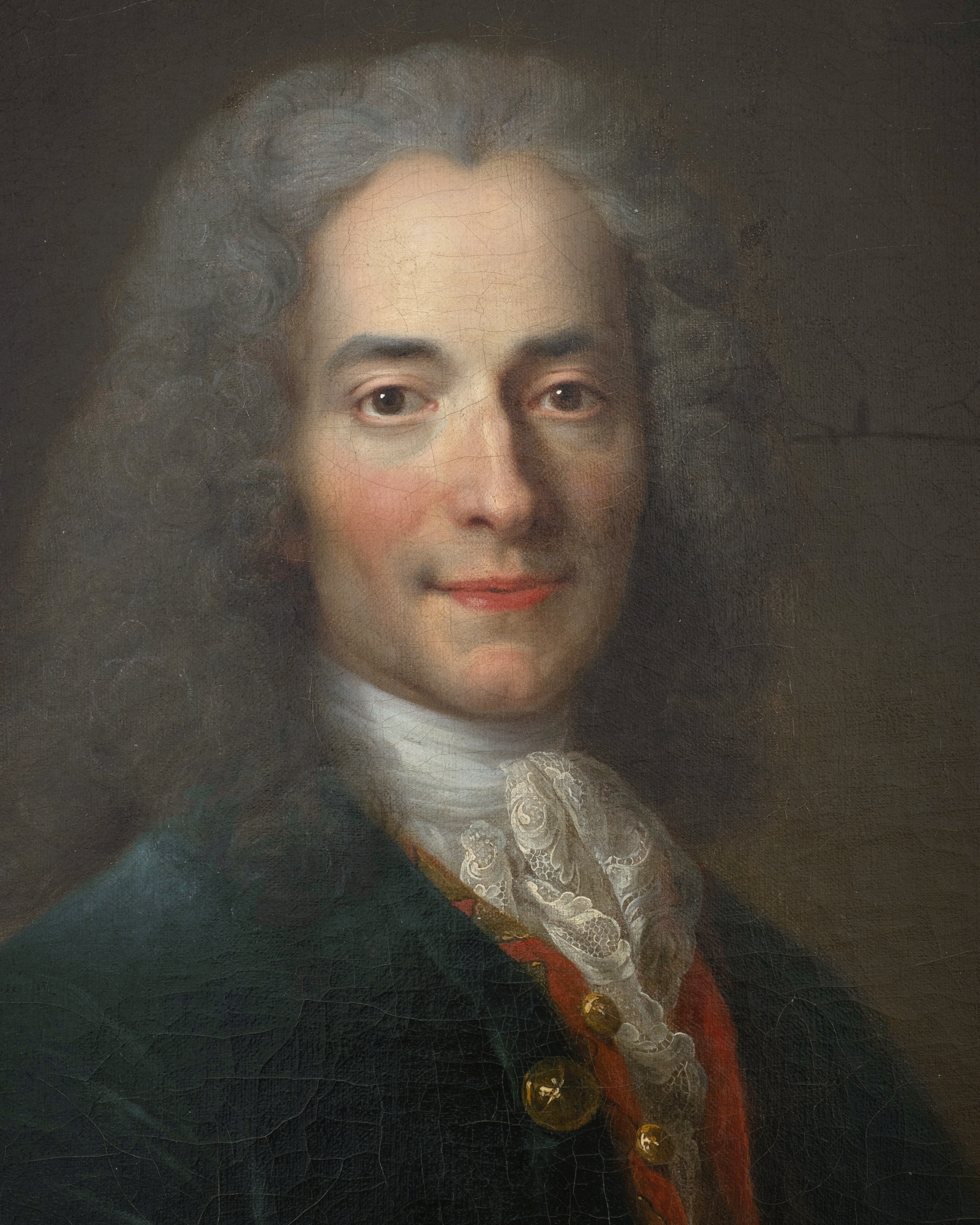
Voltaire, the author of Zaïre. In addition to his many other plays which have inspired opera librettists, Voltaire also wrote several libretti himself, most notably that for Rameau's Le temple de la Gloire.

Voltaire's Zaïre (The Tragedy of Zara) was given its first public performance on 13 August 1732 by the Comédie française at the Théâtre de la rue des Fossés Saint-Germain. It was a great success with the Paris audiences and marked a turning away from tragedies caused by a fatal flaw in the protagonist's character to ones based on pathos. The tragic fate of its heroine is caused not through any fault of her own, but by the jealousy of her lover and the intolerance of her fellow Christians. Voltaire ostensibly set the play in the "Epoch of Saint Louis". However, the plot and characters are largely fiction. The historical characters alluded to, members of the Lusignan and Châtillon families, were related to events of the Crusades but not alive at the time of Louis IX. The characters' names in the original French are:

- Orosmane, (Osman) the Sultan of Jerusalem
- Zaïre, (Zara) a Christian slave kidnapped as a baby when Cesarea was sacked by the Muslim armies and the lover of Orosamane
- Nérestan, a French knight, and unbeknownst to Zaïre, her brother
- Lusignan, a descendant of the Christian princes of Jerusalem, now a prisoner of the Sultan and, unbeknownst to Zaïre, her father
- Fatime, (Fatima) a slave girl and Zaïre's friend
- Châtillon, a French knight and comrade of Nérestan
- Corasmin and Mélédor, officers of the Sultan
- Un esclave, an unnamed slave

The play's melodramatic plot and a setting that appealed to the orientalism in vogue in late-18th- and early-19th-century Europe made it popular with opera composers. Zaïre has been the inspiration for at least thirteen operas. One of the earliest operatic adaptations was Peter Winter's Zaire which premiered in 1805 at The King's Theatre in London with the famous Italian contralto, Giuseppina Grassini, in the title role. Bellini's 1829 Zaira, also based on the play, was expressly written for the inauguration of the Teatro Regio di Parma but was a failure on the opening night and has been rarely performed since then. Johann Andreas Schachtner's libretto for Mozart's unfinished opera Zaïde, was based largely on a 1778 singspiel, The Seraglio, or The Unexpected Reunion of Father, Daughter and Son in Slavery. However, both appear to have been significantly influenced by the plot and themes of Zaïre which had been performed in Salzburg as late as 1777.

== List of operas ==
Clorinda dying in Tancredi's arms, from a 1589 edition of Tasso's La Gerusalemme liberata

The earliest work on this list, Rinaldo innamorato by Francesca Caccini, dates from 1623 when opera was still in its infancy and performed only in private palaces or court theatres. During this period operas co-existed with other forms of music drama which featured virtuoso singing – the intermedio (a short spectacle performed between the acts of a play with its own story-line) and the madrigale concertato (literally "concerted madrigal", a dramatic composition for voices and instruments, often performed semi-staged). Several works in those genres were also based on Tasso's La Gerusalemme liberata, including:

- A set of intermedi composed by Cesare Marotta on the imprisonment, enchantment and liberation of Rinaldo (first performed in Rome in 1612)
- Giovanni Rovetta's Le lagrime di Erminia (published in 1629)
- Monteverdi's, Il combattimento di Tancredi e Clorinda (first performed in Venice in 1624)
- Domenico Mazzocchi's Olindo e Sofronia (published in 1637)

The operas below are listed in chronological order by the date of their first performance. Where this is unavailable, or the opera premiered many years after the composer's death, the date of composition is given.

=== 17th-century operas ===
- Rinaldo innamorato (1623, Florence) composed by Francesca Caccini; libretto after Tasso's La Gerusalemme liberata (music lost)
- Erminia sul Giordano (1633, Rome) composed by Michelangelo Rossi; libretto by Giulio Rospigliosi, after Tasso's La Gerusalemme liberata
- L'Armida (1639, Venice) composed by Benedetto Ferrari; libretto by Benedetto Ferrari, after Tasso's La Gerusalemme liberata
- L'Amore trionfante dello sdegno (1641, Ferrara) composed by Marco Marazzoli; libretto after Tasso's La Gerusalemme liberata
- Armide (1686, Paris) composed by Jean-Baptiste Lully; libretto by Philippe Quinault, after Tasso's La Gerusalemme liberata
- La Gerusalemme liberata (1687, Venice) composed by Carlo Pallavicino; libretto by Vincenzo Grimani and Girolamo Frisari, after Tasso's La Gerusalemme liberata
- Gli avvenimenti di Erminia e di Clorinda (1693, Venice) composed by Carlo Francesco Pollarolo; libretto by Giulio Cesare Corradi, after Tasso's La Gerusalemme liberata (music lost)
- Gli amori e incanti di Rinaldo con Armida (1694, Rovigo) composed by Teofilo Orgiani; libretto by Giralomo Colatelli, after Tasso's La Gerusalemme liberata (music lost)

=== 18th-century operas ===
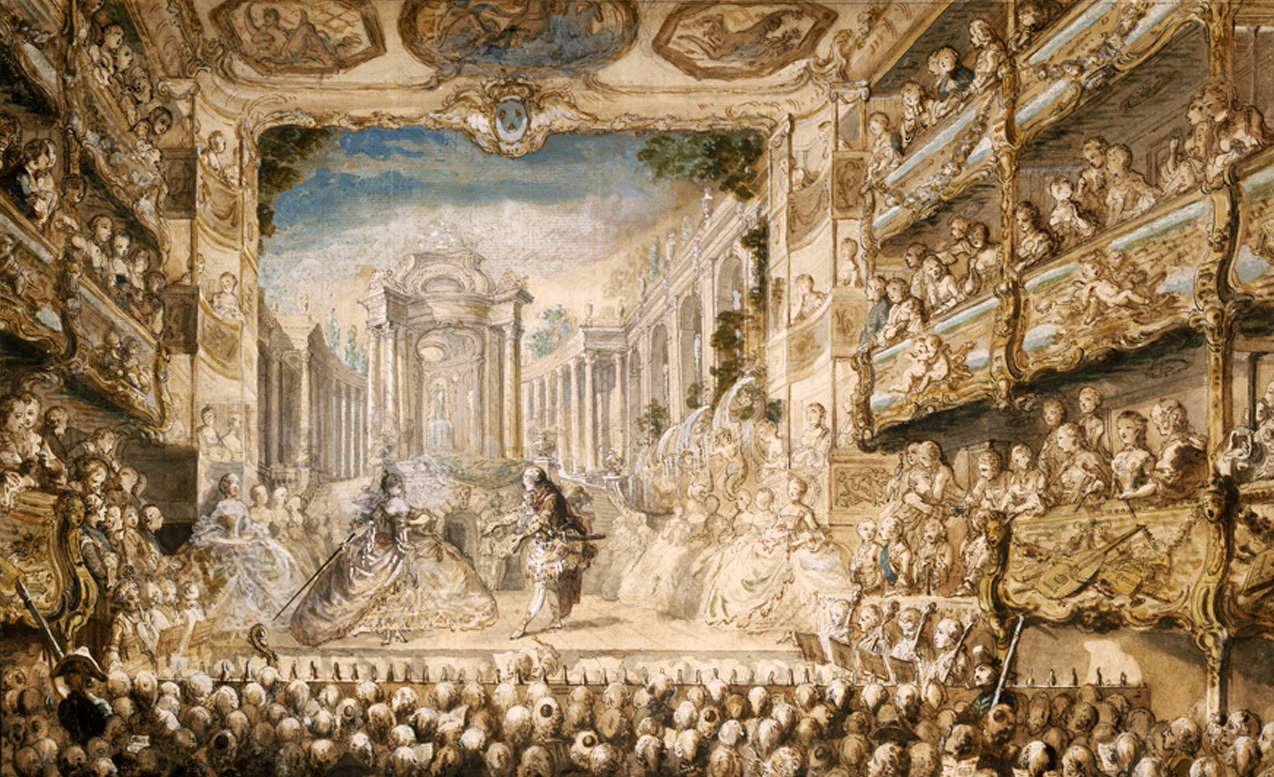
A performance of Lully's opera Armide in the Salle du Palais-Royal in 1761

- Tancrède (1702, Paris) by André Campra; libretto by Antoine Danchet, after Tasso's La Gerusalemme liberata
- Armida abbandonata (1707, Venice) composed by Giovanni Maria Ruggieri; libretto by Francesco Silvani, after Tasso's La Gerusalemme liberata
- Armida al campo (1708, Venice) composed by Giuseppe Boniventi; libretto by Francesco Silvani after Tasso's La Gerusalemme liberata
- Isacio tiranno (1710, Venice) composed by Antonio Lotti; libretto by Francesco Briani, based loosely on the conquest of Cyprus by Richard I of England during the Third Crusade
- Rinaldo (1711, London) composed by George Frideric Handel; libretto by Giacomo Rossi after Tasso's La Gerusalemme liberata
- Armida regina di Damasco (1711, Verona) composed by Teofilo Orgiani (music lost)
- Armida in Damasco (1711, Venice) composed by Giacomo Rampini; libretto by Grazio Braccioli
- Armida al campo d'Egitto (1718, Venice) composed by Antonio Vivaldi; libretto by Giovanni Palazzi, after Tasso's La Gerusalemme liberata
- Das eroberte Jerusalem, oder Armida und Rinaldo (1722, Braunschweig) composed by Georg Caspar Schürmann; libretto by Johann Samuel Müller, after Tasso's La Gerusalemme liberata
- Armida abbandonata (1725, Prague) composed by Antonio Bioni; libretto by Francesco Silvani, after Tasso's La Gerusalemme liberata
- Armida al campo (1726, Breslau) composed by Antonio Bioni; libretto by Francesco Silvani, after Tasso's La Gerusalemme liberata
- Il trionfo di Armida (1726, Venice) composed by Tomaso Albinoni; libretto by Girolamo Colatelli, after Tasso's La Gerusalemme liberata
- Riccardo primo, re d'Inghilterra (1727, London) composed by George Frideric Handel; libretto by Paulo Antonio Rolli after Francesco Briani's Isacio tiranno
- L'abbandono di Armida (1729, Venice) composed by Antonio Pollarolo; libretto by Giovanni Boldini, after Tasso's La Gerusalemme liberata
- Armida (1751, Berlin) composed by Carl Heinrich Graun; libretto by Leopoldo di Villati, after Tasso's La Gerusalemme liberata
- La Armida aplacada (1750, Madrid) composed by Giovanni Battista Mele; libretto by Giovanni Ambrogio Migliavacca, after Tasso's La Gerusalemme liberata
- Armida (1761, Vienna) composed by Tommaso Traetta; libretto by Giacomo Durazzo after Tasso's La Gerusalemme liberata
- Armida abbandonata (1770, Naples) composed by Niccolò Jommelli; libretto by Francesco Saverio De Rogatis, after Tasso's La Gerusalemme liberata
- Armida (1771, Vienna) composed by Antonio Salieri; libretto by Marco Coltellini after Tasso's La Gerusalemme liberata
- Armide (1777, Paris) composed by Christoph Willibald Gluck; libretto by Philippe Quinault, after Tasso's La Gerusalemme liberata
- Armida (1777, Venice) composed by Gennaro Astarita; libretto by Giovanni Ambrogio Migliavacca and Giacomo Durazzo, after Tasso's La Gerusalemme liberata
- Armida (1780, Milan) composed by Josef Mysliveček; libretto by Giovanni Ambrogio Migliavacca after Philippe Quinault
- Armida (1784, Eszterháza) composed by Joseph Haydn; librettist unknown, after Tasso's La Gerusalemme liberata
- Richard Coeur-de-lion (1784, Paris) composed by André Grétry; libretto by Michel-Jean Sedaine, based on the imprisonment of Richard I after the Third Crusade

Henriette Méric-Lalande who created the title role in Bellini's Zaira and Palmide in Meyerbeer's Il crociato in Egitto

- Sofronia ed Olindo (1793, Naples) composed by Gaetano Andreozzi; libretto by Carlo Sernicola, after Tasso's La Gerusalemme liberata
- Zaira (1797, Venice) composed by Sebastiano Nasolini; libretto by Mattia Butturini, after Voltaire's Zaïre

=== 19th-century operas ===
- La Zaira (1802, Lisbon) composed by Marcos Antônio Portugal; libretto by Mattia Butturini, after Voltaire's Zaïre
- Zaira ossia Il trionfo della religione composed by Vincenzo Federici; libretto by Mattia Butturini, after Voltaire's Zaïre
- Zaira (1805) composed by Peter Winter; libretto by Filippo Pananti, after Voltaire's Zaïre
- Gabriella di Vergy (1816, Naples) composed by Michele Carafa; libretto by Andrea Leone Tottola, based on the tragedy Gabrielle de Vergy (1777) by Dormont De Belloy.
- Fayel (1817, Florence) composed by Carlo Coccia; libretto by Andrea Leone Tottola, based on the tragedy Gabrielle de Vergy (1777) by Dormont De Belloy.
- Armida (1817, Naples) composed by Gioachino Rossini; libretto by Giovanni Schmidt, after Tasso's La Gerusalemme liberata
- Ricciardo e Zoraide (1818, Naples) composed by Gioachino Rossini; libretto by Francesco Berio de Salsa, after Niccolò Forteguerri's epic poem, Il Ricciardetto
- Pietro l'eremita (1822, London) composed by Gioachino Rossini; libretto by Andrea Leone Tottola, a version of Rossini's Mosè in Egitto with the plot changed to one based on Peter the Hermit
- Il crociato in Egitto (1824, Venice) composed by Giacomo Meyerbeer; libretto by Gaetano Rossi, after Jean-Antoine-Marie Monperlier's Les Chevaliers de Malte set in the Sixth Crusade.
- Gabriella di Vergy (1826, first performed 1869, Naples) composed by Gaetano Donizetti; libretto by Andrea Leone Tottola, based on the tragedy Gabrielle de Vergy (1777) by Dormont De Belloy.
- Le comte Ory (1828, Paris) composed by Gioachino Rossini; libretto by Eugène Scribe and Charles-Gaspard Delestre-Poirson
- Gabriella di Vergy (1828, Lisbon) composed by Saverio Mercadante; libretto by Antonio Profumo, based on the tragedy Gabrielle de Vergy (1777) by Dormont De Belloy
- Zaira (1829, Parma) composed by Vincenzo Bellini; libretto by Felice Romani, after Voltaire's Zaïre
- Zaira (1829) composed by Alessandro Gandini; libretto by Felice Romani, after Voltaire's Zaïre
- Il talismano, ovvero La terza crociata in Palestina (1829, Milan) composed by Giovanni Pacini; libretto by Gaetano Barbieri, after Sir Walter Scott's novel, The Talisman
- Der Templer und die Jüdin (The Templar and the Jewess) (1829, Leipzig) composed by Heinrich Marschner, libretto by Wilhelm August Wohlbrück, after Sir Walter Scott's novel, Ivanhoe
- Zaira (1831, Naples) composed by Saverio Mercadante; libretto by Felice Romani, after Voltaire's Zaïre
- Ivanhoe (1832, Venice) composed by Giovanni Pacini; libretto by Gaetano Rossi
- Emma d'Antiochia (1834, Venice) composed by Saverio Mercadante; libretto by Felice Romani
- Il templario (1840, Turin) composed by Otto Nicolai; libretto by Girolamo Maria Marini, after Sir Walter Scott's Ivanhoe
- I Lombardi alla prima crociata (1843, Milan) composed by Giuseppe Verdi; libretto by Temistocle Solera, after Tommaso Grossi's 1829 epic poem of the same name
- Die Kreuzfahrer (The Crusaders) (1844, Cassel) composed by Louis Spohr; libretto by Louis Spohr, after August von Kotzebue's play of the same name
- Richard en Palestine (1844, Paris) composed by Adolphe Adam; libretto by Paul Foucher based on Richard I of England in the Third Crusade
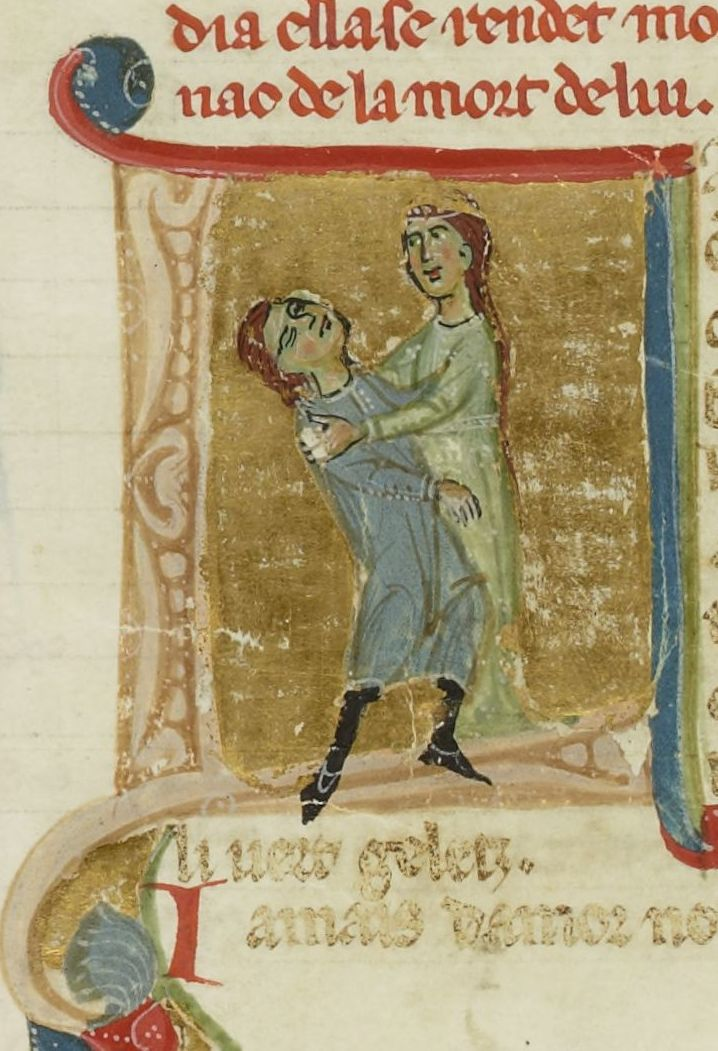
  Jaufre Rudel dying in the arms of Hodierna of Tripoli (13th-century manuscript)
- Zaira (1845, Modena) composed by Antonio Mami; libretto by Felice Romani, after Voltaire's Zaïre
- The Crusaders (1846, London) composed by Julius Benedict; libretto by Alfred Bunn and Jules-Henri Vernoy de Saint-Georges, which conflates events from the First Crusade (by way of Tasso's La Gerusalemme liberata) and the Third Crusade.
- Jérusalem (1847, Paris) composed by Giuseppe Verdi; libretto by Alphonse Royer and Gustave Vaëz
- Aroldo (1857, Rimini) composed by Giuseppe Verdi; libretto by Francesco Maria Piave
- Il talismano (1874, London) composed by Michael Balfe as The Knight of the Leopard and completed after his death by Michael Costa; libretto by Giuseppe Zaffira after Sir Walter Scott's novel, The Talisman
- Zaïre (1887, Lille) composed by Charles-Édouard Lefebvre; libretto by Paul Collin, after Voltaire's Zaïre
- Zaïre (1890, Paris), composed by Paul Véronge de la Nux; libretto by Édouard Blau and Louis Besson, after Voltaire's Zaïre

=== 20th-century operas ===
- Flammen (1902, Vienna) composed by Franz Schreker; libretto by Dora Leen
- Azara (1903, Boston) composed by John Knowles Paine; libretto by Paine, after the anonymous medieval French story Aucassin and Nicolette.
- Armida (1904, Prague) composed by Antonín Dvořák; libretto by Jaroslav Vrchlický, after Tasso's La Gerusalemme liberata
- Castle Agrazant (1929, Cincinnati) composed by Ralph Lyford; libretto by Ralph Lyford set in the aftermath of the Ninth Crusade

=== 21st-century operas ===
- L'amour de loin (2000, Salzburg) composed by Kaija Saariaho; libretto by Amin Maalouf, loosely based on the life of the troubador, Jaufre Rudel, who died during the Second Crusade
- Armida (2005, Channel 4 television) composed by Judith Weir; libretto by Judith Weir, loosely based on Tasso's La Gerusalemme liberata
- The Children's Crusade (2009, Toronto) composed by R. Murray Schafer; libretto by R. Murray Schafer, based on the 13th-century Children's Crusade
