= Gwen Catley =

English coloratura soprano (1906–1996)

Gwen Catley singing "Il bacio" by composer Luigi Arditi and lyricist Gottardo Aldighieri.

Gwendoline Florence Catley (9 February 1906 – 12 November 1996) was an English lyric coloratura soprano who sang in opera, concert and revues. She often sang on radio and television, and made numerous recordings of songs and arias, mostly in English. She was renowned for the clarity and agility of her voice particularly in florid parts, and her English diction was outstanding.

== Biography ==
Catley was born in London in 1906. She studied at the Guildhall School of Music, where her chief singing teacher was the tenor Walter Hyde. Her other teachers included Sir Granville Bantock, Jenny Hyman and, privately, Julian Kimbell. The school's principal, Sir Landon Ronald, who had been Dame Nellie Melba's accompanist, said Catley reminded him of Melba. She won the Gold Medal but was prevented from accepting it by her father. She later won it again. In 1937 she sang with Sadler's Wells Opera, as the Queen of the Night in Mozart's The Magic Flute and Nannetta in Verdi's Falstaff. After a successful and sold-out 1938 debut at the Wigmore Hall, which Landon Ronald sponsored, she joined the BBC Chorus. She had a successful career, singing with the leading British orchestras.

In World War II she sang for a year in Jack Hylton's revue Hi-de-Hi, where she was famed for her performances of "Caro nome" from Verdi's Rigoletto. She also sang Gilda with the Carl Rosa Opera Company during the war. In 1949 she sang Catherine Glover in a BBC studio broadcast of Bizet's The Fair Maid of Perth, with Richard Lewis as Henry Smith and conducted by Sir Thomas Beecham. She continued singing with the Carl Rosa company till 1957. In 1953 she took part in the first British broadcast of Stravinsky's The Rake's Progress. She often worked with the conductors Stanford Robinson and his brother Eric Robinson, who together account for many of her recordings.

She retired to Italy with her cellist husband Allen Ford, with whom she had a son. She returned to Britain to teach, her students including Judi Dench for a production of Cabaret.

Gwen Catley died in Hove on 12 November 1996, aged 90.

Many of her recordings are still available. They include a Witch in the first complete recording of Purcell's Dido and Aeneas, with Nancy Evans (Dido), Roy Henderson (Aeneas), conducted by Clarence Raybould. She appears on The Record of Singing: Volume 4, The Anglo-American School.
