= Love Me Forever (film) =

1935 film

- Film poster
- Directed by: Victor Schertzinger
- Written by: Victor Schertzinger; Jo Swerling; Sidney Buchman
- Starring: Grace Moore
- Cinematography: Joseph Walker
- Edited by: Viola Lawrence; Gene Milford
- Music by: Victor Schertzinger
- Distributed by: Columbia Pictures
- Release date: June 27, 1935
- Running time: 91 minutes
- Country: United States
- Language: English
- Box office: $745,900 (U.S. and Canada rentals)

Love Me Forever (also released as On Wings of Song) is a 1935 American drama film directed by Victor Schertzinger. The film was nominated for an Academy Award for Best Sound Recording (John P. Livadary). Grace Moore performed the song "Il bacio" by composer Luigi Arditi and lyricist Gottardo Aldighieri in the film.

== Cast ==
- Grace Moore as Margaret Howard
- Leo Carrillo as Steve Corelli
- Robert Allen as Phillip Cameron
- Spring Byington as Clara Fields
- Michael Bartlett as Michael Bartlett
- Luis Alberni as Luigi
- Douglass Dumbrille as Miller
- Thurston Hall as Maurizio

== Release ==
The film had its world premiere at Radio City Music Hall in New York City on June 27, 1935.

== Reception ==
Writing for The Spectator, Graham Greene made light of the film's use of excerpts from La Bohème and described Moore's acting as "undistinguished", suggesting that the success of the film is due in large part to Carrillo's performance.

The film grossed $100,019 in its opening week at Radio City Music Hall. It was the highest grossing film in the United States in July 1935.

It was the tenth most popular film at the British box office in 1935–36.
