= Marietta Piccolomini =

Italian opera singer (1834–1899)

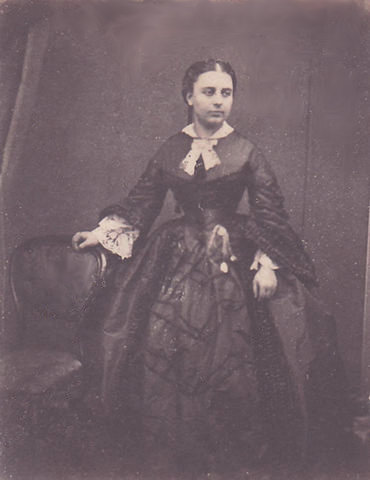
- Marietta Piccolomini ca. 1860
- Born: Maria Teresa Violante Piccolomini Clementini; 5 March 1834; Siena, Italy
- Died: 11 December 1899 (aged 65); Florence, Italy
- Occupation: Operatic soprano

Marietta Piccolomini (Italian: [mariˈetta pikkoˈlɔːmini]; 5 March 1834 – 11 December 1899) (Note: The birthdate given in this article is stated by the Register of baptisms — year 1834 — number 215 — of the former Parish of Saints Quiricus and Julitta in Sienna, while the death date given is engraved upon the singer's tombstone in the Florence Cimitero delle Porte Sante (Giampaolo Bianchi, op. cit.). Therefore, the different conflicting dates reported by various sources (birthdates include 15 March 1834; death dates include 11 February, and 20 or 23 December 1899) are to be held unfounded.) was an Italian soprano. She was most famous for the role of Violetta in La Traviata by Giuseppe Verdi, which she performed in England, France, and the United States, as well as her native Italy. The famous waltz song "Il bacio" (1860) was created specifically for her by composer Luigi Arditi and lyricist by Gottardo Aldighieri. After her marriage in 1863, she retired from performing, making only rare charity or courtesy appearances thereafter.

== Biography ==
Marietta Piccolomini was born Maria Teresa Violante Piccolomini Clementini in Siena, Italy on 5 March 1834. She was descended from Italian noble House of Piccolomini, and her parents were horrified at her wanting to pursue a career in opera, but she succeeded in persuading them to allow her to do so.

From the age of four years, Marietta had amused herself at playing at mock theatrical representations. She used to sing duets with her mother, a skilful amateur, and she had been instructed by mezzosoprano Rosa Mazzarelli, and later trained with Pietro Romani (1791–1877), one of the first professional singing teachers in Italy. It was under his guidance that she debuted at Florence's Teatro La Pergola in January 1852, taking the title role of Donizetti's Lucrezia Borgia and later also appearing in Crispino e la comare by Luigi and Federico Ricci. In November 1852 she was engaged at Rome's Teatro Argentina, where she performed in Donizetti's Poliuto, Antonio Cagnoni’s Don Bucefalo and Verdi's I masnadieri and I Lombardi alla prima crociata. In Pisa in 1853, she sang, among others, the title role in Luisa Miller, in Reggio Emilia, the same year, Leonora in Il trovatore, and in Turin, in 1855, Violetta in La Traviata, a role in which she became especially famous. The response in Turin was a spectacle not seen before in the world of entertainment. Throngs surrounded her hotel. Men tried to unharness the horses from her carriage so that they might draw it through the streets themselves but she would not permit this.

=== International career ===
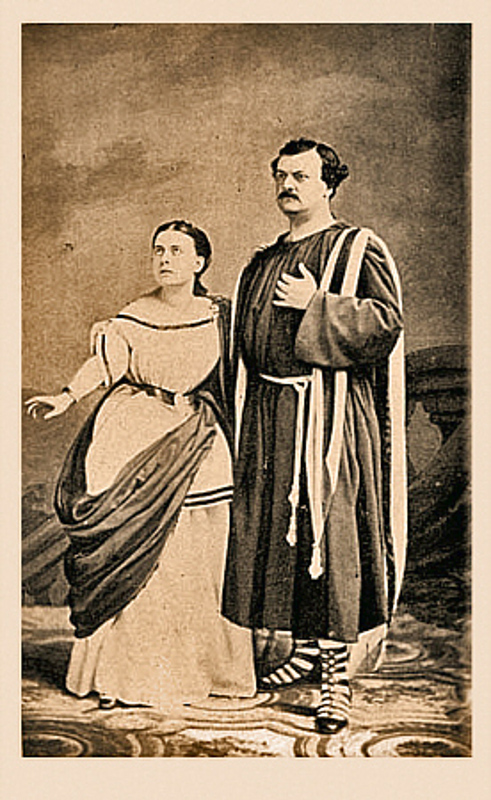
Marietta Piccolomini, with tenor Pasquale Brignoli during her American tour) Daguerreotype by Jeremiah Gurney

When word of her success in Turin reached Britain, she was invited to sing the British premiere of La Traviata at Her Majesty's Theatre in London, where she appeared for the first time on May 24, 1856. (Note: According to Ellen Creathorne Clayton (p. 386), on May 5 (thus before her London debut in Traviata!) Piccolomini appeared in Lucia di Lammermoor. In fact, the date should be correctly referred to the 1857 opening performance (The Saturday Review, III, 2 May, p. 413, and 9 May 1857, p. 429). Also according to Clayton, the music had to be transposed or adapted to suit her capabilities.) In spite of the doubts raised by music critics about her technical skills as a singer, audiences received her exceedingly well and she "was adopted at once as the pet (and afterwards how much petted!) child of Her Majesty's Theatre". On June 26, Piccolomini appeared for the first time as Maria, in La figlia del reggimento, and on July 26 in Don Pasquale. Although these performances revealed her inexperience, critics praised her dramatic ability. Following her season in England, Picolomini sang in Dublin with great success.

Piccolomini's appearance in Paris in Traviata on December 6, 1856, was the first time the opera had been heard in France. Verdi tried to stop the opera from being performed at Théâtre des Italiens owing to lack of copyright for his operas in France at the time, also supporting the claims of the French holder of the rights on Alexandre Dumas's La Dame aux camélias (whence the opera is drawn), but without success. Again, while critics remarked on the limitations of her voice and singing, they praised her natural talent and stage presence. When the Empress Eugénie heard that she had missed the most talked-about premiere in Paris, she sent word to Calzado, the director of the theatre, and a command performance was arranged for the Emperor Napoleon III and her.

Piccolomini returned to the United Kingdom on April 21, 1857, and performed in La figlia del reggimento again and also in Don Giovanni (Zerlina), Lucia di Lammermoor and Le Nozze di Figaro (Susanna). She had been working hard to improve her technique as a result of the criticism she had received the year before. She then made a provincial tour which included Liverpool, Manchester, Birmingham, Glasgow, Edinburgh, Bath, Bristol, Cheltenham, Brighton, and other places. Then she repaired again to Dublin. In November and December she went with Giuglini on a starring tour through Holland and Germany.

In 1858 Mademoiselle Piccolomini took part both in the first experimental winter season of Her Majesty's Theatre and in the ordinary one, revisiting some of her repertoire roles and presenting for the first time in London La zingara, a highly successful Italian version of Balfe's The Bohemian Girl (with all recitatives set to music), and Verdi's Luisa Miller, which was not however as warmly received. She also debuted the roles of Amina in La sonnambula by Vincenzo Bellini and Serpina in La serva padrona by Giovanni Paisiello.

After her usual tour around the provinces and in Dublin, in October she left for the United States, where she debuted at the New York Academy of Music with her favourite La Traviata, and then moved to Philadelphia and several other large American cities, (Note: Including New Orleans where she performed in La Traviata at the Théâtre d'Orleans in March of 1859.) proposing her repertoire of operas by Verdi, Donizetti, Paisiello and Mozart, and enjoying almost as much success as in London.

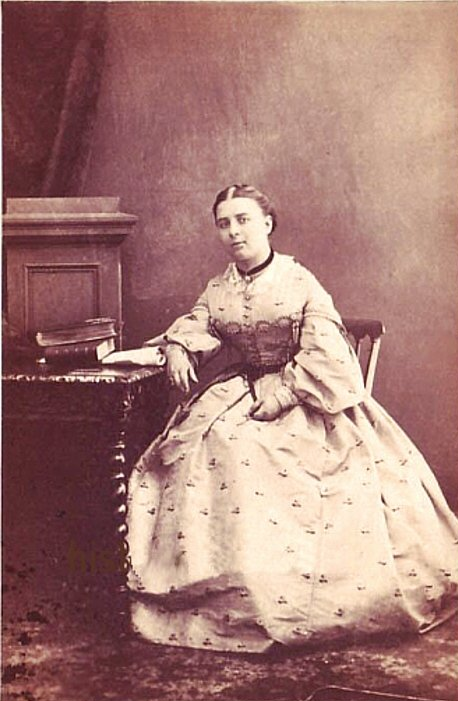
Photograph by Camille Silvy, 1860

In June 1859 she returned to London, appearing at the Theatre Royal, Drury Lane in sixteen or seventeen performances, the last of which being her London debut in Il trovatore. In 1860 she performed the world premiere of the famous waltz song "Il bacio" at a concert in Brighton. This song was created specifically for her by composer Luigi Arditi and lyricist Gottardo Aldighieri, and was dedicated to her in its original printing by the London music publishing firm Cramer, Beale & Chappell in 1860. After touring around the provinces as usual, she finally returned to Italy.

=== Marriage and retirement ===
In April 1860 she was persuaded by Fabio Campana's entreaties to appear for the last time at Her Majesty's Theatre in the premiere of his Almina, and the following month she married the Marquis Francesco Caetani della Fargna (1824–1906), settling in Florence. Thereafter she retired from the stage, taking part only in rare charity concerts or making courtesy appearances. In 1863, however, she heard of the preparations in London for some benefit concerts in honour of Benjamin Lumley, the former impresario of Her Majesty's Theatre, who had launched her international career seven years earlier and who was by then ruined. Driven by gratitude, she decided on her own initiative to make the long journey to London and took part in the performances which, given the unavailability of Her Majesty's Theatre, (Note: Out of hatred for Lumley, at the last moment Lord Ward had refused to lend Her Majesty's Theatre to the organizing committee.) had to be held at the Drury Lane.

Marquise Caetani della Fargna died of pneumonia on 11 December 1899 at her villa in Florence. She is interred in the Cimitero delle Porte Sante at the Basilica di San Miniato al Monte.

== Sources ==
- Luigi Arditi, My reminiscences, second edition, London, Skeffington, 1896 (accessible for free online at Internet Archive)
- (in Italian) Gianpaolo Bianchi, Marietta Piccolomini Clementini – La vicenda artistica di una cantante senese nel Risorgimento, Sienna, Cantagalli (collection: "Le esperienze di Clio"), 2011.
- Ellen Creathorne Clayton, Queens of Song, Londra, Smith, Elder & Co., 1863 (accessible online as a Google ebook-gratis)
- (in Italian) Federica Camata, Piccolomini, Marietta, in Dizionario Biografico degli Italiani- Volume 83 (2015)
- Benjamin Lumley, Reminiscences of the Opera, Londra, Hurst & Blackett, 1864 (accessible online as a Google ebook-gratis)
- "The Saturday Review of Politics, Literature, Science, and Art", Londra, years 1856, 1857, 1858, 1859, accessible online as a Google ebook-gratis, as follows:
  - Volume II, 1856
  - Volume III, 1857/1
  - Volume IV, 1857/2
  - Volume V, 1858/1
  - Volume VI, 1858/2
  - Volume VII, 1859/1
  - Volume VIII, 1859/2
