= Alessandro Sala =

Alessandro Sala may refer to:

- Alessandro Sala (composer)
- Alessandro Sala (footballer)
