= Landon Ronald =

English conductor, composer and pianist (1873–1938)

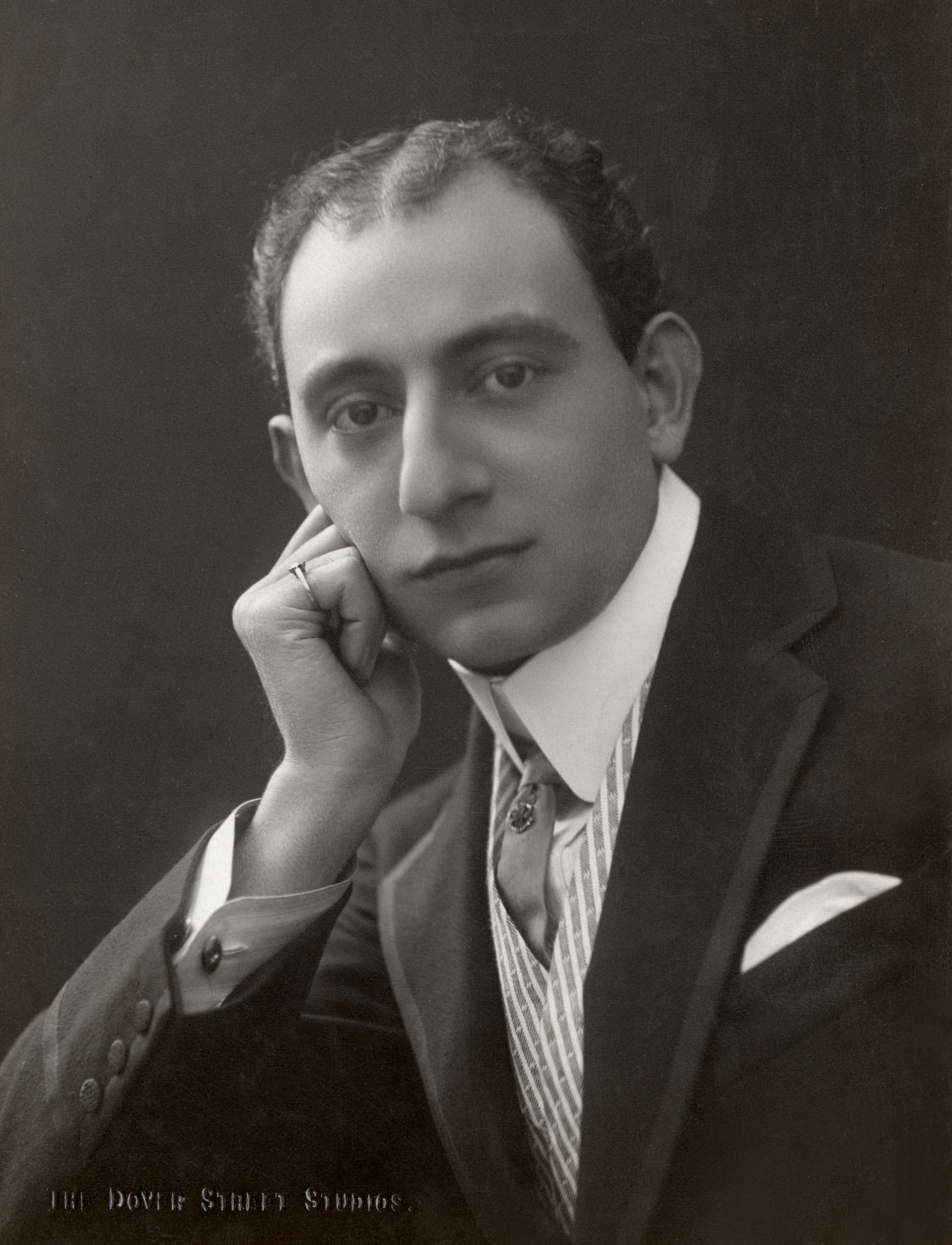
Landon Ronald, c. 1910

Sir Landon Ronald (born Landon Ronald Russell) (7 June 1873 – 14 August 1938) was an English conductor, composer, pianist, teacher and administrator.

In his early career he gained work as an accompanist and répétiteur, but struggled to make his way as a conductor. In the absence of operatic or symphonic work he made his living as a conductor and composer in West End shows in the late 19th and early 20th century. With the foundation of the London Symphony Orchestra in 1904 his career began to flourish, and by 1908 he was well-enough established to be chosen to succeed Thomas Beecham as conductor of the New Symphony Orchestra in London.

Ronald was an early enthusiast for recording, and was associated with the Gramophone Company (later part of EMI) from 1900 for the rest of his life.

From 1910 until shortly before his death, Ronald was principal of the Guildhall School of Music in London. He modernised the curriculum and raised its standards to compete with the leading musical training establishments the Royal Academy of Music and the Royal College of Music.

== Life and career ==
=== Early years ===
Ronald was born in Kensington, London, the illegitimate son of Henry Russell, singer, songwriter and merchant, and his partner Hannah de Lara, a painter. He was the younger brother of the impresario Henry Russell and half-brother of the novelist William Clark Russell. He was educated at St Marylebone Grammar School and a boarding school in Margate, and took private music lessons from the violinist Henry Holmes and the composer Kate Loder. Between 1884 and 1890 he was enrolled at the Royal College of Music, where he studied under Hubert Parry and Charles Villiers Stanford.

In 1891 Ronald was appointed "maestro al piano" (accompanist and répétiteur) at the Royal Opera House; this was valuable experience, bringing him into contact with leading singers and with the scores of the opera repertoire. In her memoirs, Nellie Melba told how Ronald coached her in Manon, playing the accompaniment from memory, having learned the piece from scratch overnight. The following year he became conductor of Augustus Harris's touring opera company. In 1894, he toured the United States as accompanist for Melba. He composed piano music and songs, some of which were well received. He first conducted at Covent Garden in July 1896, for a production of Faust, starring Melba, Charles Bonnard and Pol Plançon. In August 1897 he married Mimi Ettlinger (1873–1932), daughter of a Frankfurt cloth merchant; they had one son.

Operatic and concert work was in short supply for young English conductors at the time; Ronald was obliged to seek employment in musical comedy in the late 1890s and early 1900s. Among those for whom he conducted and composed were Harry Graham, Lionel Brough, Kate Cutler, Evie Greene and John Le Hay. Neither this employment nor his engagement from 1898 as conductor of the Winter Gardens concerts in Blackpool helped his professional advancement in the snobbish atmosphere of fin de siècle England.

Ronald continued to compose serious music; a song-cycle, "Summertime", was written for the tenor Ben Davies, who premiered it in 1901. The music critic of The Manchester Guardian called the songs "melodious", but added that they "impressed by their graceful lyrical character rather than by evidence of any inventive fancy."

=== His Master's Voice and orchestral appointments ===
Adelina Patti sings "Il bacio" by composer Luigi Arditi and lyricist by Gottardo Aldighieri. Recorded in Wales in December 1905 with Ronald as pianist.

In 1900 Ronald was approached by Fred Gaisberg of the recording firm the Gramophone Company, a predecessor of EMI. He accepted the post of musical adviser, and was the pianist on many of the company's early song recordings. Gaisberg calculated that Ronald's varied musical contacts would help the new company recruit the distinguished performers it needed. Ronald helped the company to sign up Melba and other leading singers including Adelina Patti, Charles Santley and Enrico Caruso. He remained closely connected with His Master's Voice for the rest of his career, becoming a director in 1930 and a founder-director of Electrical and Musical Industries (EMI) formed by the merger of His Master's Voice with its rival, the Columbia Graphophone Company in 1931.

In 1901 Ronald was conductor of London's Queen's Hall concerts and in the same year he was contracted by Blackpool's Winter Gardens as conductor of summer Sunday concerts until where Adelina Patti, Nellie Melba and Caruso performed. He held this position until the First World War. Ronald began to make progress as a conductor after the foundation of the London Symphony Orchestra (LSO) in 1904. He was a frequent guest conductor of the LSO, and in 1905 he was appointed director of the Birmingham Promenade Concerts. When Thomas Beecham parted company from the New Symphony Orchestra in 1908, Ronald succeeded him as its conductor. The orchestra was later known as the Royal Albert Hall orchestra; Ronald remained with it until 1928, when it disbanded. He and the orchestra began recording for His Master's Voice in 1909. Their recorded repertoire comprised mostly overtures and short orchestral pieces, mainly by Tchaikovsky and Wagner, but also longer works including the Peer Gynt Suite and Schubert's Unfinished Symphony. Ronald also worked with the Scottish Orchestra, and in continental European countries.

Landon Ronald conducted over four hundred times at the Royal Albert Hall, London between 1898 and 1936, mainly with the Royal Albert Hall Orchestra. His last performance at the Hall was on 4 February 1936 for the 'Memorial Concert in Commemoration of His Late Most Gracious Majesty King George V', where he conducted and played the piano.

Ronald was also closely associated with the music of Elgar. In later life he recalled Parry's "smacking me on the back and saying 'I heard yesterday Richter perform the Enigma Variations by a Mr. Elgar, which is the finest thing I have listened to for years. Look out for this man's music'." He was the pianist in the first performance of Elgar's Violin Sonata in E minor in 1919, with W H Reed the violinist, and was the dedicatee of Falstaff, a work regarded by some as Elgar's masterpiece, though Ronald admitted privately, "Never could make head or tail of the piece". He recorded little of Elgar's music, because His Master's Voice signed the composer up to record his own works; Ronald recorded the "Coronation March" in March 1935, a year after Elgar's death.

As a conductor Ronald was especially noted as a concerto accompanist; the critic Robert Elkin described Arthur Nikisch as "the finest accompanist until Landon Ronald". His repertoire was limited. Unlike Adrian Boult he did not feel it his duty to present difficult modern works. Elgar and Richard Strauss were the only contemporary composers with whose music he was much associated. He retired from conducting in 1929.

=== Later years ===
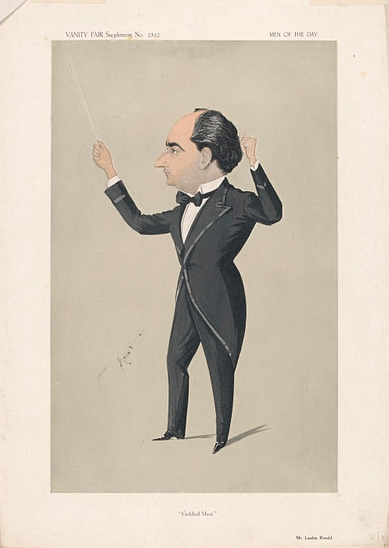
"Guildhall Music" Ronald as caricatured in Vanity Fair, December 1913

In 1910 Ronald succeeded W H Cummings as principal of the Guildhall School of Music, a post he held until 1938. He overhauled the curriculum and the administration of the school. According to his biographer, Raymond Holden, "By modernizing teaching methods, and increasing the morale of those working and studying at the institution, he raised the status of the school." He also formed a professors' club to bring a more collegiate spirit into the school. Under Ronald the standard of teaching was brought into line with that of the Royal Academy of Music and the Royal College of Music. In his later years he laid great emphasis on the importance of live music, and worried that broadcasting and the gramophone were making music so ubiquitous and casually accessible that it was no longer special.

Among Ronald's output as a composer are more than 200 songs. They include "Serenade espagnole" recorded by Caruso. The critic Michael Kennedy writes, "His compositions include a symphonic poem, an overture, a ballet, Britannia's Realm, composed for the coronation of Edward VII in 1902, and incidental music to Robert Hichens’s The Garden of Allah (1921, Drury Lane), but it is his song Down in the Forest that has survived."

Ronald was knighted in 1922, and published a volume of memoirs, Variations on a Personal Theme in the same year. He published a second volume, Myself and Others, in 1931. Landon was also the editor of the first edition of Who's Who in Music in 1935. In 1932 Ronald's wife died by suicide; he married Mary Callison b. 1895, (Aunt of Lady Bridget Faulks, née Bodley b.1921), of Manchester shortly afterwards.

Ronald died in London at the age of 65 after two years of declining health.
