= Viceconte =

Viceconte is an Italian surname. Notable people with the surname include:

- Ernesto Viceconte (1836–1877), Italian composer
- Maura Viceconte (born 1967), Italian long-distance runner

== See also ==
- Micaela Viciconte
