= Genia =

Genia may refer to:

- Génia, London-based Russian virtuoso concert pianist and composer
- Genia Berkovich (later named Ziv Berkovich, born 1984), Israeli cinematographer and screenwriter
- Genia Fonariova, also Russian-born American singer.
- Genia Technologies, a US nanopore based DNA sequencing company, a fully owned subsidiary of Hoffmann-La Roche
- Will Genia (born 1988), Australian rugby union player
