= Cramer & Co. =

Former London music shop and instrument manufacturer

Coordinates: 51°30′42.23″N 0°8′38.68″W

J. B. Cramer & Co.
- Type: Private
- Industry: Musical instruments
- Founded: 1824 as Cramer, Addison & Beale
- Founder: Johann Baptist Cramer
- Defunct: 1964; 62 years ago
- Fate: Acquired by Kemble & Co.
- Headquarters: London, England
- Products: Pianos

J. B. Cramer & Co. was an English musical instrument manufacturing, music-publishing and music-selling business in London, founded in 1824 by the musician Johann Baptist Cramer. Its New Bond Street premises closed in 1964 when the company was taken over by Kemble & Co.

== History ==
It was founded in 1824 by the musician Johann Baptist Cramer in partnership with Robert Addison and Thomas Frederick Beale, the company then being known as Cramer, Addison & Beale. Johann Baptist Cramer ceased involvement with the business at the end of 1833 and in 1844 Addison broke from the partnership with Beale, going into business with Robert Hodson who had previously been in partnership with Lewis Henry Lavenu forming Addison & Hodson across the road from Cramer & Co. at 210, Regent Street, opposite Conduit Street.

The business was then known as Cramer, Beale & Co.. William Chappell then went into partnership with Beale, but broke the partnership in 1847 and the business was then carried on by Thomas Beale. Chappell rejoined the partnership and finally retired in 1861. The name Cramer, Beale & Chappell was used on publications at that time; including in the first publication of the famous waltz song "Il bacio" (1860) by composer Luigi Arditi and lyricist Gottardo Aldighieri which was an international hit. In 1862 George Wood went into partnership with the Beales, during which time the name Cramer, Beale & Wood was used. By 1864 the Beales had left the company and the name Cramer, Wood, & Co was then used.

The main premises were at 201, Regent Street and 67, Conduit Street, on the corner of Conduit Street and Regent Street. This address was associated with the company from the 1820s until the 1890s. In 1873 the company opened showroom premises known as "Cramer's Great City Warehouse" or "Cramer's City Warerooms", originally between 43 and 46, Moorgate Street, later including nos.40-42.

From 1896 to 1901 the main premises were located at 207 and 209 Regent Street (these addresses having been used by the company since at least 1864), then moving to 126 Oxford Street by 1902. In 1912, the main premises were moved to 139 New Bond Street, where they remained until the company was taken over by Kemble & Co piano manufacturers in 1960, who, for a limited period continued to use the "J.B. Cramer & Co." name.

Cramer pianos are now made for delivery to the Far East, where the Cramer name has a good reputation and they are still made to Kemble's traditional British piano designs.

The music publisher Cramer Music is currently located in Watford. It was located in Garrick Street, London from 1991 to 2013.
