= Boston Opera House (disambiguation) =

The Boston Opera House is a building at 539 Washington St. in Boston, Massachusetts.

Boston Opera House may also refer to:

- Grand Opera House (Boston), est. 1888, Washington Street (near Dover Street)
- Boston Opera House (1909), Huntington Ave.
