= Maria Spezia-Aldighieri =

Italian operatic soprano

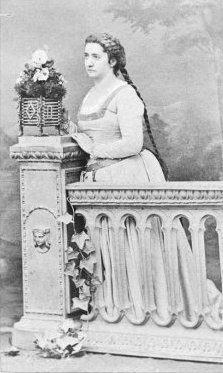
- Maria Spezia-Aldighieri
- Born: 1828; Villafranca di Verona
- Died: 1907; Colognola ai Colli
- Occupation: Italian operatic soprano

Maria Spezia-Aldighieri (1828–1907) was an Italian operatic soprano who had an active international career from 1849 up into the 1870s. She excelled in the coloratura soprano repertoire and was particularly admired for her portrayals in the operas of Giuseppe Verdi. Her performance of Violetta in Verdi's La traviata at the Teatro San Benedetto in Venice in 1854 is credited with popularizing the opera after it had initially flopped at its premiere in 1853. She was married to baritone Gottardo Aldighieri and is the great grandmother of singer George Aaron.

== Life and career ==
Born Maria Spezia in Villafranca di Verona, Spezia-Aldighieri studied singing with Domenico Foroni in Verona. She made her professional opera debut at the Teatro Filarmonico in 1849 in the title role of Vincenzo Bellini's Beatrice di Tenda. She returned there soon after in the title roles of Gaetano Donizetti's Maria Padilla and Verdi's Attila. In 1852–1853 she was committed to the Mariinsky Theatre in Saint Petersburg, Russia. She then spent the next two decades performing in the leading opera houses in Italy, including the Teatro di San Carlo, the Teatro Regio di Turino, the Teatro Costanzi, the Teatro Apollo, the Teatro alla Canobbiana, and La Fenice. She also performed at the Teatro Real in Madrid.

In 1854 Spezia-Aldighieri was invited by Verdi to portray the role of Violetta in La traviata at the Teatro San Benedetto in Venice. The work had previously been mounted only once, at La Fenice in March 1853, and had been a complete failure at its premiere. This second production was a complete triumph for both the opera and Spezia Aldighieri, whom Verdi and the critics credited with making the work a success. She later repeated the role of Violetta at the Théâtre-Italien in Paris and at many other Italian theatres, including La Scala. In his notes for his unfinished opera Re Lear, Verdi named Spezia Aldighieri as an ideal performer for the role of Cordelia.

In 1855–1856 Spezia-Aldighieri was committed to the Teatro Nacional de São Carlos where she was billed as Marietta Spezia. Among the roles she sang there were Abigaille, Bice in Errico Petrella's Marco Visconti, Elvira in Ernani, Leila in Giuseppe Apolloni's L'ebreo, Leonora in Il trovatore, Rosina in The Barber of Seville, Violetta, and the title role in Maria di Rohan. In 1857 she performed the role of Inez in Donizetti's La favorita at Her Majesty's Theatre in London opposite Antonio Giuglini. That same year she made her debut at La Scala as Valentine in Giacomo Meyerbeer's Les Huguenots. She returned to that house in 1858 to portray the role of Mathilde in the world premiere of Stefano Ronchetti-Monteviti's Pergolese.

In 1861 Spezia-Aldighieri portrayed Abigaille opposite her husband in the title role of Verdi's Nabucco at both La Scala and the Teatro di San Carlo. In 1862 she sang Amelia to her husband's Renato in the Naples premiere of Verdi's Un ballo in maschera. That same year she created roles in the world premieres of Vincenzo Moscuzza's Don Carlo (Elisabetta di Valois) and Enrico Bevignani's Caterina Blum at the Teatro di San Carlo. One of her last performances was at the Teatro Comunale di Bologna in 1872 in the title role of Bellini's Norma. Some of the other roles she sang on stage were Amalia in I masnadieri, Desdemona in Otello, Gilda in Rigoletto, Giselda and Viclinda in Verdi's I Lombardi alla prima crociata, Lady Macbeth in Verdi's Macbeth, Lucrezia in Verdi's I due Foscari, Maria in Carlo Pedrotti's Mazeppa, and the title roles in Donizetti's Anna Bolena and Gemma di Vergy, Achille Peri's Giuditta, Verdi's Luisa Miller, and Pedrotti's Marion de Lorme.

She died in Colognola ai Colli in 1907.

== Sources ==
- The Musical world, Volume 35
- L'Italia musicale, Volume 2 By Francesco Lucca
- Studi verdiani edited by P. Petrobelli
- Maria Spezia Aldighieri at operissimo.com
