= Giuseppe Staffa =

Italian composer and conductor

Giuseppe Staffa (1807–1877) was an Italian composer and conductor. He is best remembered for his seven operas which he composed between 1827 and 1852. He was active as a conductor in Naples at the Teatro del Fondo and Teatro Nuovo. One of his students was Enrico Bevignani.
