= Genia Fonariova =

Russian-born American singer

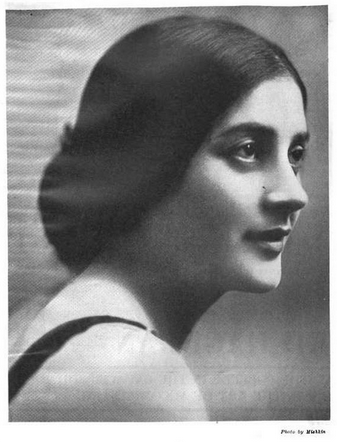
Genia Fonariova, from a 1921 publication.

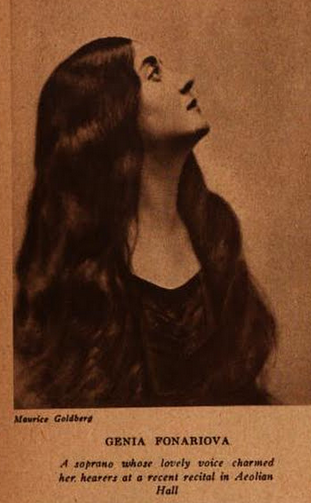
Genia Fonariova, from a 1920 publication.

Genia Fonariova, also seen as Eugenie Baron-Fonariova, was a Russian-born American singer.

== Early life ==
Genia Fonariova was born in Odessa, and began her music career in Petrograd, Russia. She also performed in Brussels and London before moving to New York City during World War I.

== Career in the United States ==
In 1916 Fonariova was part of a program at the Manhattan Opera House with pianist Leo Ornstein and conductor Oscar Spirescu. Fonariova sang in a Russian-themed fundraising concert for Liberty Bonds in 1918, at Carnegie Hall, sharing the bill with Sergei Prokofiev, among others. She gave a recital at New York's Aeolian Hall in 1920, a performance that caused a New York Times writer to say that "Her concert was a welcome reminder that Russian music is not merely a reflection of nature, but a crystallization in art of the spirit of a great, humble people."

In 1921-1922, she toured the United States, including autumn festivals in Maine. She sang at free summer concerts in Central Park in 1924. In 1931, she gave a concert at New York's Town Hall. She was heard in radio concerts regularly in the late 1920s and through the 1930s.

She made at least three recordings for the Victor Talking Machine Company.

== Personal life ==
Fonariova became a United States citizen in 1929.
