= Stefano Ronchetti-Monteviti =

Italian composer, music educator, and college administrator (1814–1882)

Stefano Ronchetti-Monteviti (1814–1882) was an Italian composer, music educator, and college administrator. Born in Asti, he joined the faculty of the Milan Conservatory in 1850 as a professor of counterpoint. He was appointed the school's director in 1878, a post he held until illness forced him to resign in November 1881. He died the following year in Casale Monferrato. His notable pupils included Franco Faccio, Giacomo Puccini, and Ivan Zajc. His compositional output mainly consists of sacred music. His opera Pergolese premiered at La Scala on 16 March 1857. It used a libretto by Temistocle Solera and starred soprano Maria Spezia-Aldighieri.
