= Il bacio (Arditi and Aldighieri) =

1860 song by Luigi Arditi and Gottardo Aldigheri

1866 sheet music cover for "Il bacio".

"Il bacio", also known in English as "The Kiss", is an Italian-language song with music by Luigi Arditi and lyrics by Gottardo Aldighieri. Composed in 1859–1860, it was first published in 1860 and dedicated to the soprano Marietta Piccolomini who was famous for creating the role of Violetta in the first production of Giuseppe Verdi's opera La traviata. Grove Music Online describes the song as a "famous vocal waltz", and one of Arditi's more notable compositions. The song was popular during the late 19th-century, and was subsequently interpolated into multiple Hollywood films and a Broadway musical in the 20th-century. The song has been recorded many times, often by coloratura sopranos, from the early era of sound recording of the late 19th century into the 21st century.

== History ==
=== Creation and initial publication ===
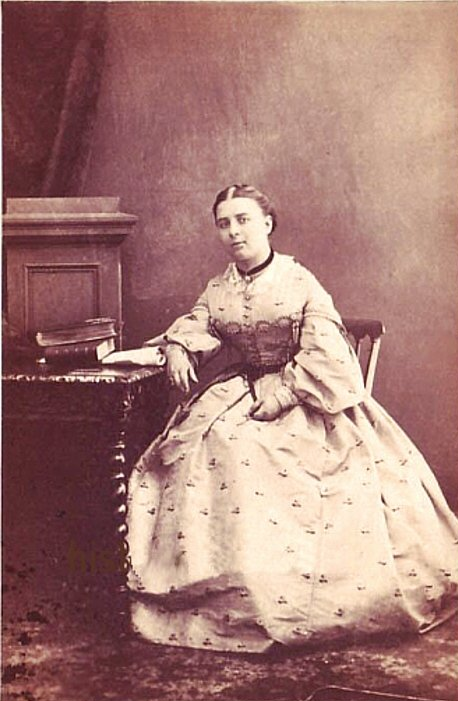
1860 photograph of Marietta Piccolomini by Camille Silvy.

"Il bacio" was first published in London, England, on 27 March 1860 by Cramer, Beale & Chappell with a published dedication of the song to the soprano Marietta Piccolomini. The origins of the song date to the Autumn of 1859 when composer Luigi Arditi and his wife, Virginia Arditi, were staying at a hotel in Manchester, England. Piccolomini was also staying at this hotel, and she overheard Arditi improvise a waltz melody on the piano in the hotel lobby which drew her admiration. She encouraged Arditi to write the improvised tune down. Arditi jotted the tune down on an envelope, and then forgot about the melody. Soon after Piccolomini left for a tour to the United States, but before departing extracted a promise from Arditi that he would compose a new song for her.

Piccolomini returned to England in 1860, and Arditi remembered his promise to write her a new song. He recalled the melody he had written down on the envelope, and decided to use it for this purpose. Struggling to find words to the tune, Arditi confided his frustration to the baritone Gottardo Aldighieri while they were rehearsing together. Aldighieri offered to write lyrics to the song but needed to know what theme the composer wanted the words to focus on. This conservation was overheard by Virginia Arditi who was in the next room sewing, and she suggested the song should be about a kiss.

Piccolomini was the first to perform the song at her concert in Brighton in 1860; performing the work only one day after she was given the music. Soon after the song was sold to Cramer, Beale & Chappell for the price of £50. After the vocal version of the song was printed in March 1860 a solo piano version was also published the following June. The song became an international hit, and while financially profitable for the publisher, never made the song's creators any more money than the initial £50 payment.

=== Later history ===
Adelina Patti, recorded in Wales in December 1905 with pianist Landon Ronald

Agnes Kimball using an English language translation; released in 1912 by Edison Records

Gwen Catley, with new English language text, "The Dream of Home", by Henry Brougham Farnie. Recorded with orchestra in 1940.

After its publication, "Il bacio" became one of the more popular waltzes of the second half of the 19th century. It was often programmed in concerts and recitals by well-known coloratura sopranos like Adelina Patti and Nellie Melba. The earliest recordings of "Il bacio" date to the late-19th century; including one by Virginia Powell Goodwin (1898, Berliner Gramophone). Early 20th-century recordings of "Il bacio" include ones featuring singers Rosalia Chalia (1900, Victor), Lucette Korsoff (1908, Gramophone Company), Alice Nielsen (1908, Victor & 1910, Columbia Records), Virginia Galván de Nava (1908, Columbia), and Josephina Huguet (1909, Gramophone).

The song was recorded frequently in the 1910s and 1920s; including ones with singers Margaret Crouch McCausland (1910, Victor), Agnes Kimball (1912, Edison Records), Bernice de Pasquali (1912, Columbia), Constance Drever (1913, Edison), Frieda Hempel (1914, Victor), Mary Carson (1915, Edison), Elsa Stralia (1916 & 1924, Columbia), Claire Lillian Peteler (1919, Edison), Graziella Pareto (1920, Gramophone), Maria Ivogün (1922, Brunswick Records), Lucrezia Bori (1923 & 1926, Victor), Mary E. Shultz (1925, Victor), Maria Kurenko (1926, Columbia) Olive Palmer (1929, Edison), and Creatore's Band with soprano Pauline Talma (1929, Victor). Other early recordings include a duet version by Hyman Adler and Lucy Gates (1921, Columbia), a recording by African-American soprano Florence Cole Talbert (1923, Black Swan Records), and a novelty whistling instead of singing version by Guido Gialdini (1911, Victor).

Maria Cebotari recorded "Il bacio" for Odeon Records with the orchestra of the Berlin State Opera led by Robert Heger in 1936. The song was interpolated into the 1938 Broadway musical Leave It to Me!; although at some point during that show's run the song was dropped. Mary Martin made a classical-jazz hybrid recording of the song for Decca Records in 1939. In cinema of the 1930s the song was performed by Grace Moore in the film Love Me Forever (1935), and by Deanna Durbin in Three Smart Girls (1936). It was also performed in the short film Uncle Sol Solves It (1938) by a then 8-year-old Beverly Sills who recorded it for the movie in August 1937. Other 1930s recordings were made by Isobel Baillie (1930, Columbia Graphophone Company), Clara Clairbert (1932, Polydor Records), Emilia Vidali (1935, Columbia Graphophone), and Miliza Korjus (1939, Victor).

"Il bacio" was also performed by Charlotte Arren (uncredited) in the movie Broadway Melody of 1940 as a parody of opera singers. It was sung by Jeanette MacDonald in the film Cairo (1942), and by Gloria Jean in the film Reckless Age (1944). A humorous 1947 parody version of the song retitled "Il barkio" was recorded by Dr. Horatio Q. Birdbath, soprano Ina Souez, and Spike Jones and His City Slickers for Victor in 1947. Some other 1940s recordings of the song include records by Gwen Catley (1940, Gramophone), and Patrice Munsel and the Al Goodman Orchestra (1946). Subsequent recordings included performances by Rita Streich and the RIAS Symphonie Orchester (1956, Deutsche Grammophon), Mado Robin with the London Philharmonic Orchestra (1956, Decca) Joan Sutherland with the London Symphony Orchestra (1963, Decca), and Eva Lind with conductor Plácido Domingo and the Munich Radio Orchestra (1986, EMI) in what was an interpolation of the aria into a recording of the opera Die Fledermaus.

Twenty-first century recordings include ones made by Anna Netrebko and the Prague Philharmonia on her album Souvenirs (2008, Deutsche Grammophon), Olga Peretyatko and the NDR Sinfonieorchester on her album Arabasque (2013, Sony Classical), and Edita Gruberová and the Stuttgart Radio Symphony Orchestra on the album The Art of Coloratura (2016, Orfeo). The song has also been used as a contest piece in the talent portion of beauty pageants; including by Laura Kaeppeler in Miss America 2012 which she won.

== Text ==
Opening melody to "Il Bacio" hand written and signed by the composer in 1893.

Sulle labbra se potessi
Dolce un bacio ti darei
Tutte ti direi le dolcezze dell'amor
Sempre assisa te d'appresso

Mille gaudii ti direi, Ah! ti direi
Ed i palpiti udirei
Che rispondono al mio cor
Gemme e perle non desio
Non son vaga d'altro affetto

Un tuo sguardo è il mio diletto
Un tuo bacio è il mio tesor
Ah! Vieni! ah vien! più non tardare a me!
Ah vien! nell'ebbrezza d'un amplesso
Ch'io viva!
Ah!

If I could, I would plant
A sweet kiss upon your lips
And whisper all the tender words of love
Sitting always by your side

I would speak of a thousand joys—ah, I would tell you all!
And I would hear the heartbeats
That answer to my own
I crave no gems or pearls
I desire no other love

A single glance from you is my delight
A single kiss from you is my treasure
Ah, come! Ah, come! Do not delay in coming to me!
Ah, come! In the rapture of an embrace
Let me live!
Ah!

== Musical analysis ==
"Il bacio" is a vocal waltz. While not defined by its creators as such, some sources have labeled "Il bacio" a concert aria. Musicologist Laurie Stras described "Il bacio" as a "tour-de-force" for coloratura soprano. The style of the song has been called similar to the waltz-like coloratura aria "Je veux vivre" from act I of Charles Gounod's Roméo et Juliette. The score of "Il bacio" has an unusually large number of articulation markings such as staccato and accent marks. Vocal pedagogue and music editor John Glenn Paton theorized that these markings may have been an attempt by the composer to capture the "vivacious style" by which Piccolomini originally performed the song.

== Derivations ==
A fiddle tune played throughout the American South, "Kiss Me Waltz" (also called "Kiss Waltz"), was derived from "Il bacio". This tune was recorded by Charlie Poole and the North Carolina Ramblers in 1926, and by Texas fiddler Captain McKinney in 1929. It has remained popular among Missouri fiddlers into the 21st century.
