= Domenico Foroni =

Italian composer, conductor, and music educator

Domenico Foroni (10 July 1796 - 24 March 1853) was an Italian composer, conductor, and music educator.

Foroni was born in Valeggio sul Mincio into a family of landowners. On 7 November 1818 he married Teresa Zovetto with whom he had five children, two of whom became famous: the operatic soprano Antonietta Foroni-Conti (1822-187?) and the composer and conductor Jacopo Foroni (1825–1858). In 1818 he was appointed to the dual position of director and principal conductor of the Teatro Filarmonico in Verona, a position he held for over 25 years. He was also highly active as a teacher of singing and music composition in that city. Among his notable pupils were Gottardo Aldighieri, Paolo Bombardi, Domenico Conti, Carlo Pedrotti, Alessandro Sala, Maria Spezia-Aldighieri, and his children. Most of his compositional output was sacred music, the majority of which was written for services at the Verona Cathedral. Most of his music is now lost, but copies of his Miserere and Messe still exist

In 1848 Foroni participated actively in the First Italian War of Independence as a member of the secret committee of Veronese patriots. On three occasions he provided the Piedmontese minister of war a detailed plan for the taking the city of Verona, but the negligence and incompetence of Charles Albert of Sardinia's generals and other staff members led to their failure on acting upon the intelligence he provided. Ultimately the first war of independence ended in a stalemate. He died in Verona in 1853.

== Sources ==
- Biography of Domenico Foroni at www.valeggio.com
