= George Aaron =

Italian singer (born 1963)

- Born: 20 September 1963 (age 62)
- Genres: Italo disco
- Occupation: Singer

George Aaron (born 20 September 1963) is an Italian singer. He first came to prominence in 1984 with the release of his album She's A Devil. He released four more albums over the next five years, selling million of records worldwide. After 14 years away from the recording studio, he released a sixth album, Don't Ask me why, in 2003. As of 2009, his discography includes ten albums. He was born with the name Giorgio Aldighieri in Vicenza and is the great-grandson of opera singers Gottardo Aldighieri and Maria Spezia-Aldighieri.

== Discography ==
- 1983 – Just For You
- 1984 – She's A Devil
- 1986 – New Sensations
- 1988 – I Heard It Through The Grapevine
- 1989 – Twist in My Sobriety
- 2003 – Don't Ask me why
- 2003 – Hot Love
- 2005 – Silly Reason
- 2007 – Heaven
- 2009 – Fear
- 2011 – World is Out
- 2011 – Russian Ladies
- 2012 – Love is In (feat Tiziana Rivale)
- 2012 – I'll never fly
- 2012 – NothingVille is a Town
- 2013 – Iza
- 2013 – Cuore Matto remix
- 2013 – Russian Ladies (radio mix)
- 2013 – Never cry for love
- 2013 – Iubesc, Amor
- 2013 – fever (mambo dance)
- 2014 – Love is in the Air (house mix)
- 2015 – Love is in the Air (Giorgio's Mix)
- 2016 – A Star in the Sky
- 2016 – White Christmas
- 2015 – If I get home on Christmas Day

== Featurings ==
- 1983 – Somebody (VIDEO)
- 1984 – Don't Stop (TIME)
- 1984 – Selling Song (TIME)
- 1984 – Sympathy for the devil (TIME)
- 1984 – Silent Smiles (RAM BAND)
- 1895 – Paradiso Land (PARADISO)
- 1985 – Sahara Sand (OTTOMIX)
- 1986 – We are the Video (VIDEO)
- 1987 – Jesahell
- 1987 – Robin Hood (WILLIAM KING)
- 2012 – The End with Andrea DP dj
- 2015 – Let it be me with Angelo Seretti

== Album ==
- 1983 – Memories on Mix
- 1997 – George Aaron Complete
- 2001 – The lost Album
- 2008 – George Aaron
- 2008 – Summer Collection 2008
- 2013 – One step further (compilation)
- 2013 – From George in Vicenza
