= Alessandro Sala (composer) =

Italian composer, organist, and pianist

Alessandro Sala (15 April 1816 – 7 February 1890) was an Italian composer, organist, and pianist. Born in Valeggio sul Mincio, at a young age he was organist at the parish in his hometown. He was mentored in music by Domenico Foroni. He composed the symphonic work Trilogia sinfonica, two operas (Ginevra di Monreale and Bice Alighieri), and several pianos works (La donna italiana, Danze e lacrime, etc.). He also wrote a significant amount of sacred music. Conductor Carlo Pedrotti, a fellow pupil of Foroni, was a notable exponent of his works, performing them not just throughout Italy but internationally as well. He died in Verona.

== Sources ==
- Biography of Alessandro Sala at www.valeggio.com
