= Aborn Opera Company =

Aborn Opera Company

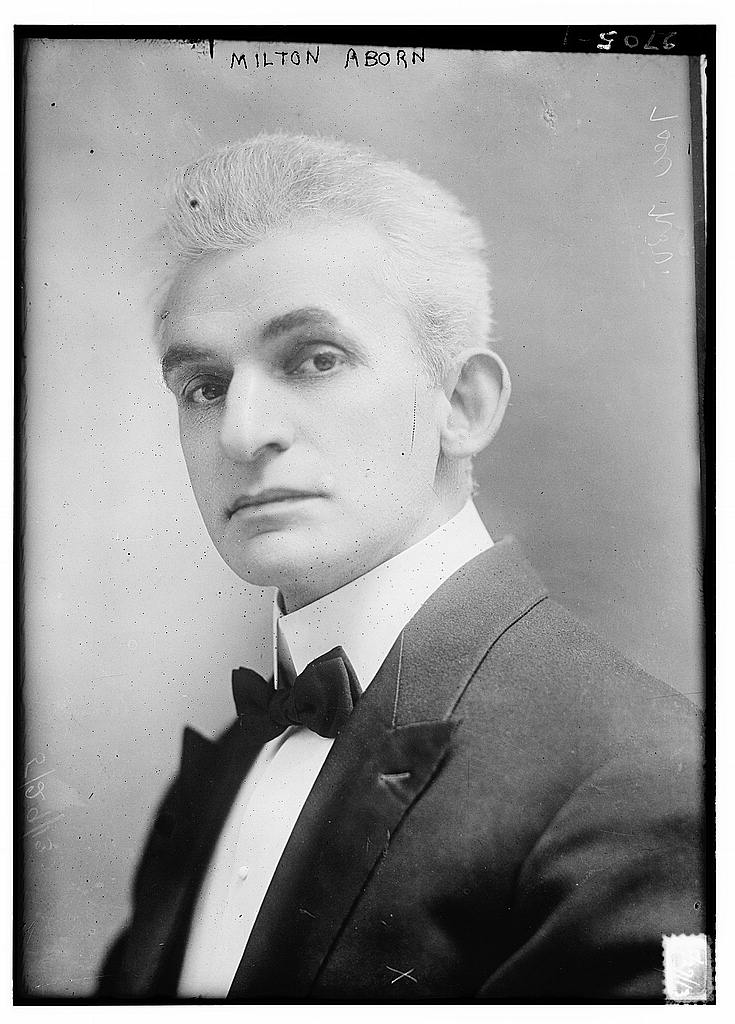
Milton Aborn circa 1913

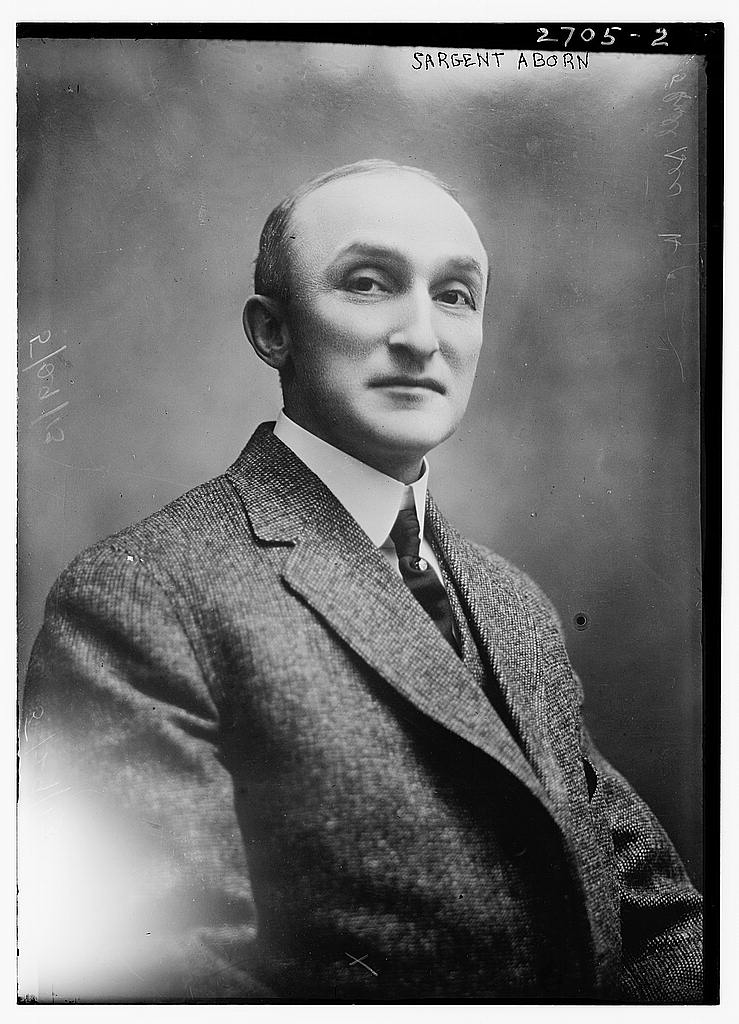
Sargent Aborn circa 1913

The Aborn Opera Company, also known as the Aborn English Opera Company, was an American opera company that was active from 1895 through 1922.

== History ==
Founded and operated by brothers Milton Aborn (1864–1933) and Sargent Aborn (1866–1956), the company was based out of New York City but spent most of its time on the road touring the United States. Milton was born in Marysville, California in 1864, and his brother Sargent was born in Boston, Massachusetts in 1866. They had been theater managers since 1885. From 1913 to 1915 they were managers at the Century Theatre in Manhattan.

Among their many performances, in September of 1892 the Aborn company appeared at the Elitch Theatre in Denver in The Pirates of Penzance.

From 1912 until 1915 Ralph Lyford conducted over 200 performances of operas with the company.
