= Castle Agrazant =

Opera by Ralph Lyford

- Opera by Ralph Lyford
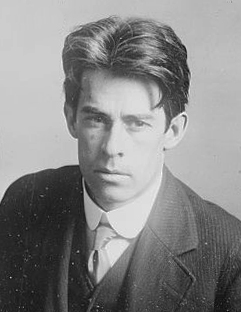
- The composer in the 1920s
- Language: English
- Premiere: April 29, 1926; Cincinnati Music Hall

Castle Agrazant is an opera composed by Ralph Lyford. It premiered on 29 April 1926 at the Cincinnati Music Hall. Castle Agrazant won a Bispham Memorial Medal Award in 1926.

== Background ==
The opera is set in Northern France in the aftermath of the Ninth Crusade – specified as 1290 in the program for the opera. Characters include Richard of Agrazant (Riego of Agrazant), a young crusader and religious zealot, and his wife Isabeau. In the story, the husband and crusader, Richard, returns to avenge his persecuted wife, Isabeau.

In the 1926 premiere, Olga Forrai performed as Isabeau, Forrest Lamont performed as Richard, and Howard Preston as Geoffrey. The opera's performances included a chorus of 65 members and 60 members of the Cincinnati Symphony. The cost to stage the production in 1926 was $15,000 (approximately $183,000 in 2010).

The opera was broadcast by radio station WLW in Cincinnati on May 3, 1926.

== Roles ==
Roles, voice types, premiere cast
Role	Voice type	Premiere cast, 29 April 1926 Conductor: Ralph Lyford
Isabeau	soprano	Olga Forrai
Richard of Agrazant	tenor	Forrest Lamont
Geoffrey of Lisiac	baritone	Howard Preston
A young boy	soprano	Fern Bryson
An old minstrel	basso	Italo Picchi
A herald		Moody DeVeaux
A knight of Lisiac		Herman Wordemann

== Synopsis ==
=== Act 1 ===
Isabeau is mourning the death of her newborn daughter, alone. Count Lisiac, a former suitor of Isabeau, seizes the opportunity of her husband's absence and her grief to approach Isabeau. When his attempts fail he turns to violence, assaulting the Castle Agrazant and kidnapping Isabeau. Isabeau conceals a note giving details of her abduction before she is taken.

Elsewhere, Richard of Agrazant is returning from Jerusalem. He passes Lisiac Hall ignorant that his wife is imprisoned there. He arrives at Castle Agrazant and sees evidence of the assault. He finds his daughter dead in the cradle and the note from Isabeau. He pledges revenge.

=== Act 2 ===
Isabeau is feted at Lisiac Hall, but takes no part in the celebrations. Geoffrey becomes inebriated and is more forward with Isabeau. As events spin out of control, Geoffrey's men debate protecting Isabeau from Geoffrey. A herald then announces the arrival of traveling musicians - a monk, a minstrel, and a boy. Geoffrey commands them to perform but asks Isabeau to select a happy song. She requests a song of Nazareth, and Richard (disguised as the monk) thereby confirms she has no desire to stay with Geoffrey.

The Boy then sings of the recent assault of Castle Agrazant, to the astonishment of Geoffrey and his men. Filled with superstitious dread, Lisiac orders the musicians cast out. The Monk interjects, offering to sing a different song - and his voice is recognized by Isabeau as her Richard's. Richard sings of his love for Isabeau and remorse at going to Jerusalem and leaving 'far from home and wife and child'.

Removing his disguise, Richard challenges Geoffrey and a melee ensues. In the melee, Isabeau is stabbed by Geoffrey; Geoffrey is run through by Richard's sword. Richard seizes Isabeau and escapes, followed by the boy and musician.

=== Act 3 ===
Richard enters, assisting Isabeau. She asks to rest and Richard encourages her to continue on. She weakens further, they do rest, apparently sleeping for the night. In the morning, Richard uses his helmet to fetch water and tells of his visit to Jerusalem. His assessment is that his crusade was in error, he sacrificed all that was worthy in its pursuit. He breaks his blade. Placing the fragments on a rock, he returns to Isabeau. Isabeau bemoans their sad fate and begins to hallucinate that she is comforting her daughter; she hears the horns of Lisiac approaching. She and Richard sing a duet extolling the possibility of living in a brighter realm in the future, forever.

== Reception ==
The review in The Cincinnati Enquirer on April 30, 1926, called the premiere "a worthy effort...given superb production in every department".
