= Giuseppe Libani =

Italian composer

Giuseppe Libani (1845-1880) was an Italian composer. Born in Rome, he is chiefly remembered for his three operas: Gulnara (1869, Palazzo Pamphilj) Il Conte Verde (1873, Teatro Apollo), and Sardanapalo (1880, Teatro Apollo). He died at the age of 35 in Rome.
