= Temistocle Solera =

Italian opera librettist (1815–1878)

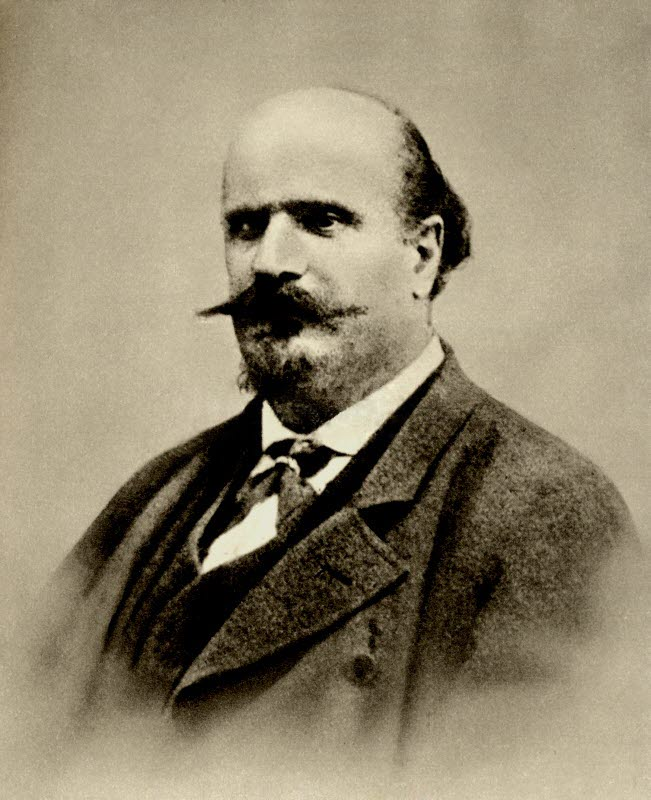
Temistocle Solera

Temistocle Solera (Italian pronunciation: [teˈmistokle soˈlɛːra]; 25 December 1815 – 21 April 1878) was an Italian opera composer and librettist.

== Life and career ==
He was born in Ferrara. He received his education at the Imperial College in Vienna and at the University of Pavia. Throughout his life he actively participated in anti-Austrian resistance. At one point, he was incarcerated for his activities. He completed several literary works, including the novel Michelino, his style influenced by Alessandro Manzoni. He then found work as a librettist; his collaboration with the composer Giuseppe Verdi began in 1839 and lasted for a few years.

Solera then found work as the impresario for the Royal Theatre in Madrid. He died in Milan in 1878.

== List of major works ==
=== Composer ===
- Ildegonda (1840)
- Il contadino d'Agliate (1841; rev. as La fanciulla di Castelguelfo in 1842)
- Genio e sventura (1843)
- La hermana de Pelayo (1845) (Pelayo is a Spanish national hero, the leader of Christian resistance in the Cantabrian mountains against the Arab invasion in the early eighth century)

=== Librettist ===
- For Giuseppe Verdi
  - Oberto, conte di San Bonifacio (1839)
  - Nabucco (1842)
  - I Lombardi alla prima crociata (1843)
  - Giovanna d'Arco (1845)
  - Attila (1846)
- For other composers
- Galeotto Manfredi (Carlo Hermann; 1842)
- La conquista di Granata (Emilio Arrieta, 1850)
- La fanciulla delle Asturie (Benedetto Secchi; 1856)
- Sordello. Also produced as L'Indovina (Antonio Buzzi, 1856; Salvador Giner Vidal, 1870)
- Pergolese (Stefano Ronchetti-Monteviti, 1857)
- Vasconcello (Angelo Villanis; 1858)
- Una notte di festa (Angelo Villanis; 1859)
- L'espiazione (Achille Peri, 1861)
- Zilia (Gaspar Villate, 1877)
