= Grand Opera House (Boston) =

Coordinates: 42°20′34.81″N 71°4′0.49″W

The Grand Opera House (est.1888) of Boston, Massachusetts, was a theatre in the South End. Architect George Snell designed the 2,600-seat building on Washington Street. Managers and proprietors included Proctor & Mansfield, A.H. Dexter, George W. Magee, and Stair & Wilbur. Performances included Glyn's Three Weeks.

== Images ==
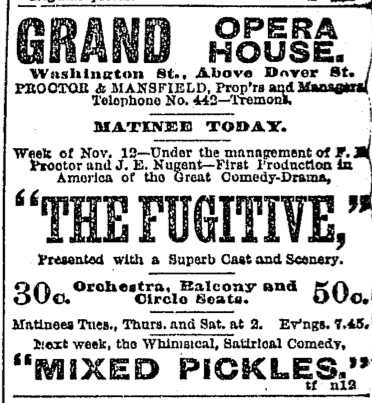
Advertisement for "The Fugitive," 1888

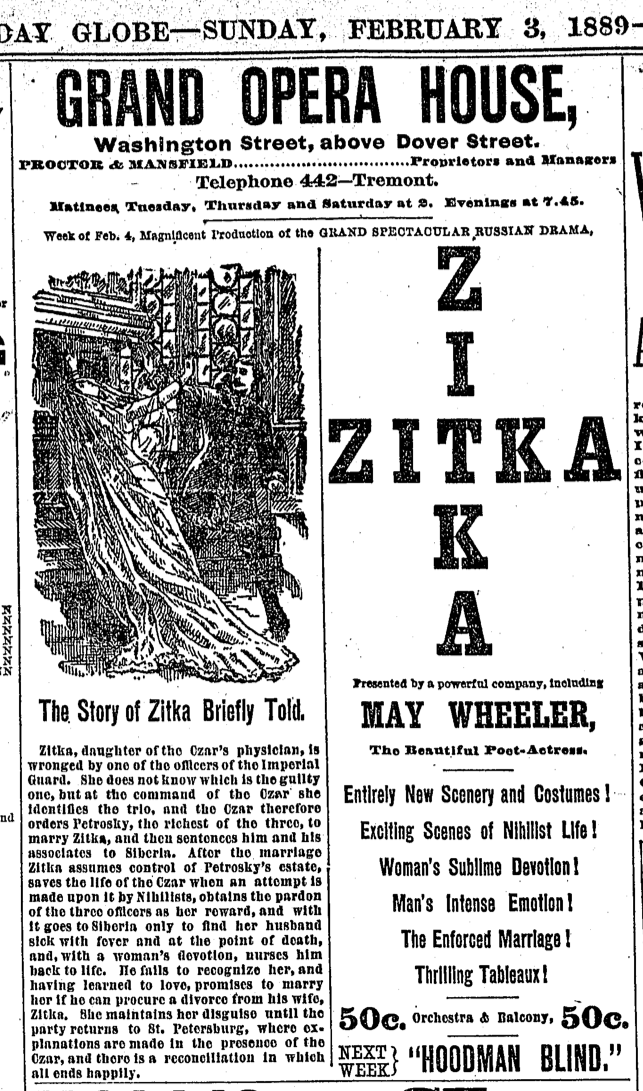
Advertisement for "Zitka" with May Wheeler, 1889

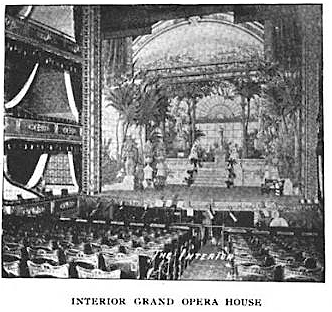
Interior, ca.1890s

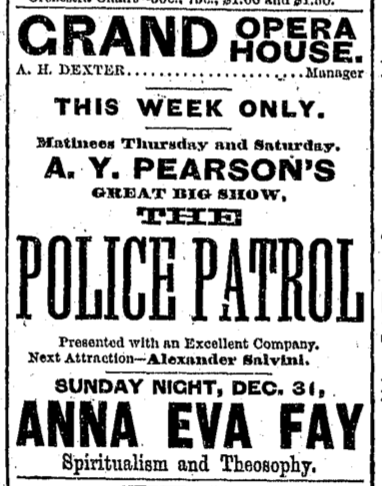
Advertisement for A.Y. Pearson's "Police Patrol," 1893

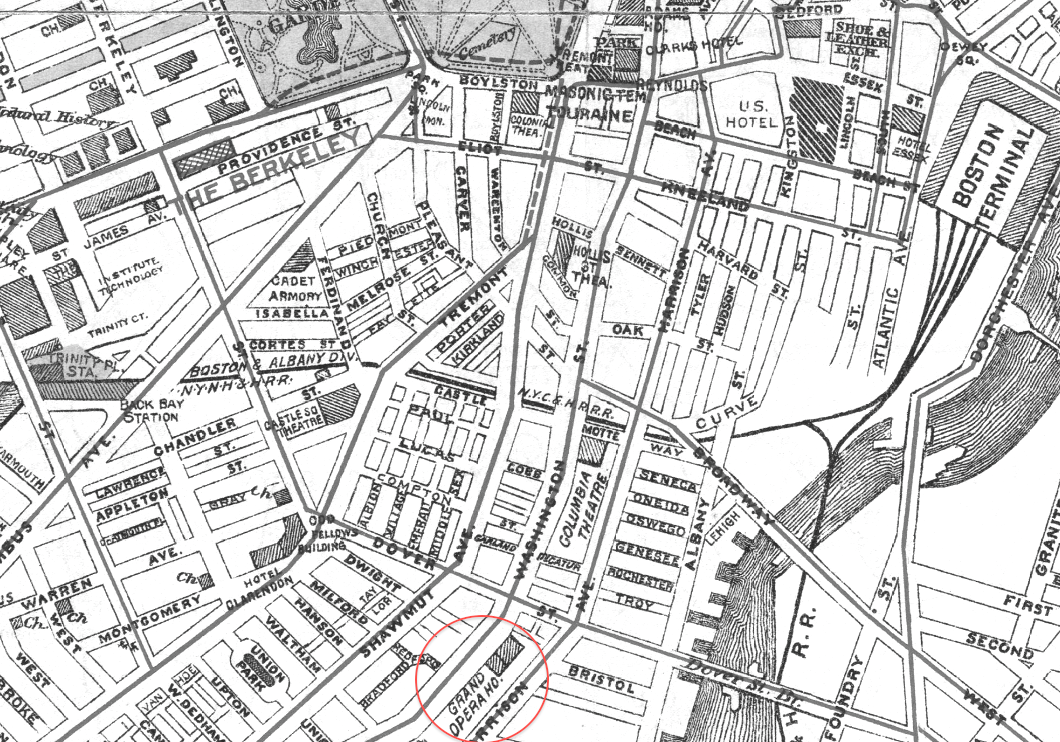
Detail of 1898 map of Boston, showing Grand Opera House
