= Ralph Lyford =

American conductor (1882–1927)

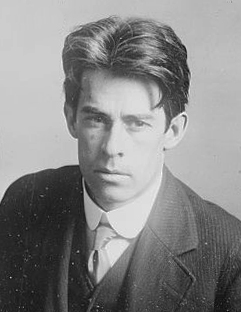
- Ralph Lyford
- Born: February 22, 1882; Worcester, Massachusetts, United States
- Died: September 3, 1927 (aged 45); Cincinnati, Ohio, U.S.
- Education: New England Conservatory of Music
- Occupations: Composer, Conductor
- Known for: Castle Agrazant, founding Cincinnati Opera
- Spouse: Ella Gillis

Ralph Lyford (February 22, 1882 – September 3, 1927) was an American composer and conductor. He rose to prominence as the managing director of the Cincinnati Opera and as a 20th-century advocate for opera to be written and performed in English.

He was married to Ella Gillis, a ballet dancer.

== Biography ==
Born in Worcester, Massachusetts, he began studies at age 12 and 6 years later graduated from Boston's New England Conservatory of Music. Lyford studied under George Whitefield Chadwick at the New England Conservatory of Music, and studied under Arthur Nikisch in Leipzig.

Ralph Lyford assisted Claude Debussy in preparing his Le martyre de Saint Sébastien for its premiere. He served as assistant conductor of the San Carlo Opera Company in the US under the management of Henry Russell. Lyford was associate conductor of the Boston Opera Company from 1908 to 1914, working as a member of Max Rabinoff's staff, and for a short time assisted in the opera department at the New England Conservatory. From 1912 to 1915 he conducted over 200 opera performances over 3 seasons with the Aborn Opera Company.

In 1912, Lyford conducted Lucia di Lammermoor at the Opera Company of Boston.

He was hired in 1916 to organize the Cincinnati Conservatory of Music and served as the head of that program. In 1920, he founded the Cincinnati Opera. In 1925, he was appointed associate conductor under Fritz Reiner. He led the opera company during its formative seasons. During his tenure, he produced and conducted 234 performances of 30 operas, including Martha, Hänsel and Gretel, and Lohengrin.

Lyford died of heart disease in Cincinnati, Ohio, on September 3, 1927.

During his tenure at the Cincinnati Opera Company, Lyford also mentored John Jacob Niles. Niles said, "Ralph Lyford was a great conductor, teacher, humorist and accompanist. He helped me greatly with the problems I had in playing accompaniments."

== Music ==
Ralph Lyford wrote mainly orchestral music, including a piano concerto. He wrote the opera Castle Agrazant, which won a Bispham Memorial Medal Award in 1926.

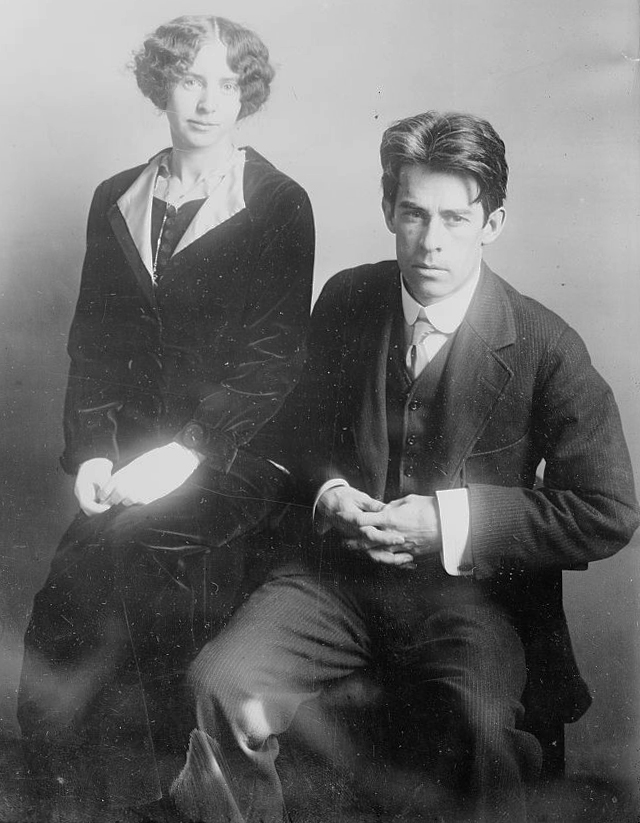
Ralph Lyford and wife, Ella Gillis

== Timeline ==
| 1882 | Born in Worcester, Massachusetts |
| 1894-1900 | Studies at the New England Conservatory of Music, graduates 1900 |
| 1907-1908 | assistant conductor of the San Carlo Opera Company |
| 1908-1914 | works as assistant conductor of the Opera Company of Boston |
| 1916 | Hired to organize the Cincinnati Conservatory of Music |
| 1916-1927 | works in Cincinnati at the Cincinnati Conservatory of Music |
| 1920 | Founded the Summer Opera Association, progenitor of the Cincinnati Opera |
| 1925 | Appointed associate conductor of the Cincinnati Conservatory of Music |
| 1926 | won a Bispham Memorial Medal Award for Castle Agrazant |
| 1927 | Died |
