= Oscar Spirescu =

Romanian conductor

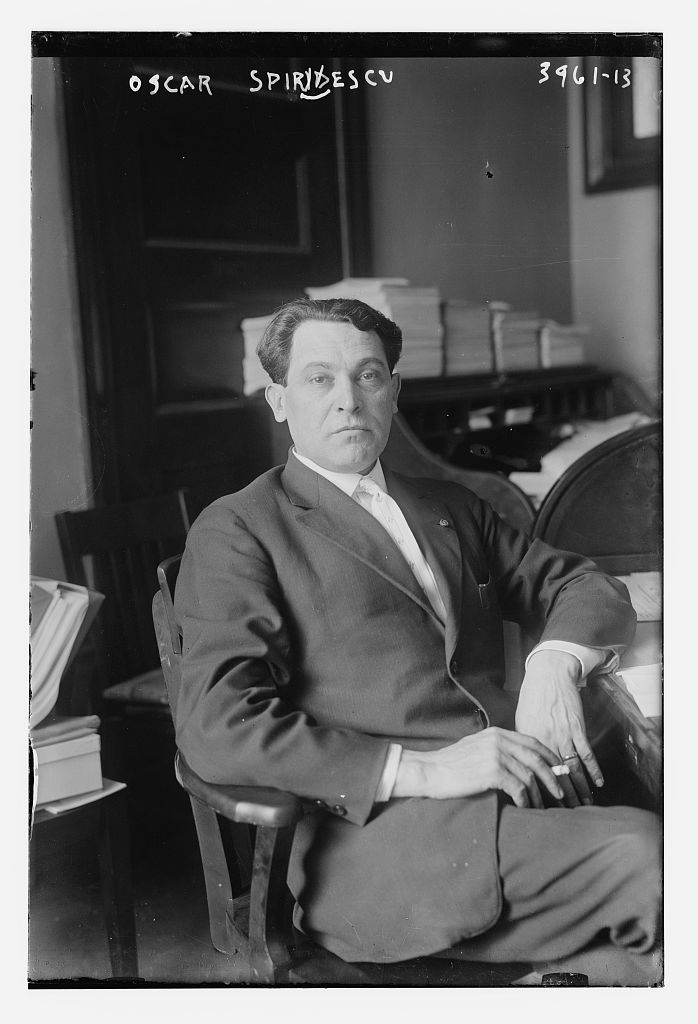
Spirescu in 1916

Oscar Spirescu (1874 – September 7, 1918) was a Romanian conductor, composer and pianist who killed himself in 1918.

== Biography ==
Spirescu was born in Bucharest, Romania. He was married and had four children in Romania. He emigrated from Romania to the United States and married for a second time.

In Romania, he was the conductor of the Romanian Opera Orchestra in Bucharest; in the US he became conductor of the Strand Symphony Orchestra at the Strand Theatre in Manhattan.

He killed himself on September 7, 1918, with chloroform in Manhattan. He died intestate and his estate was valued at $3,000.
