= Enrico Bevignani =

Italian composer

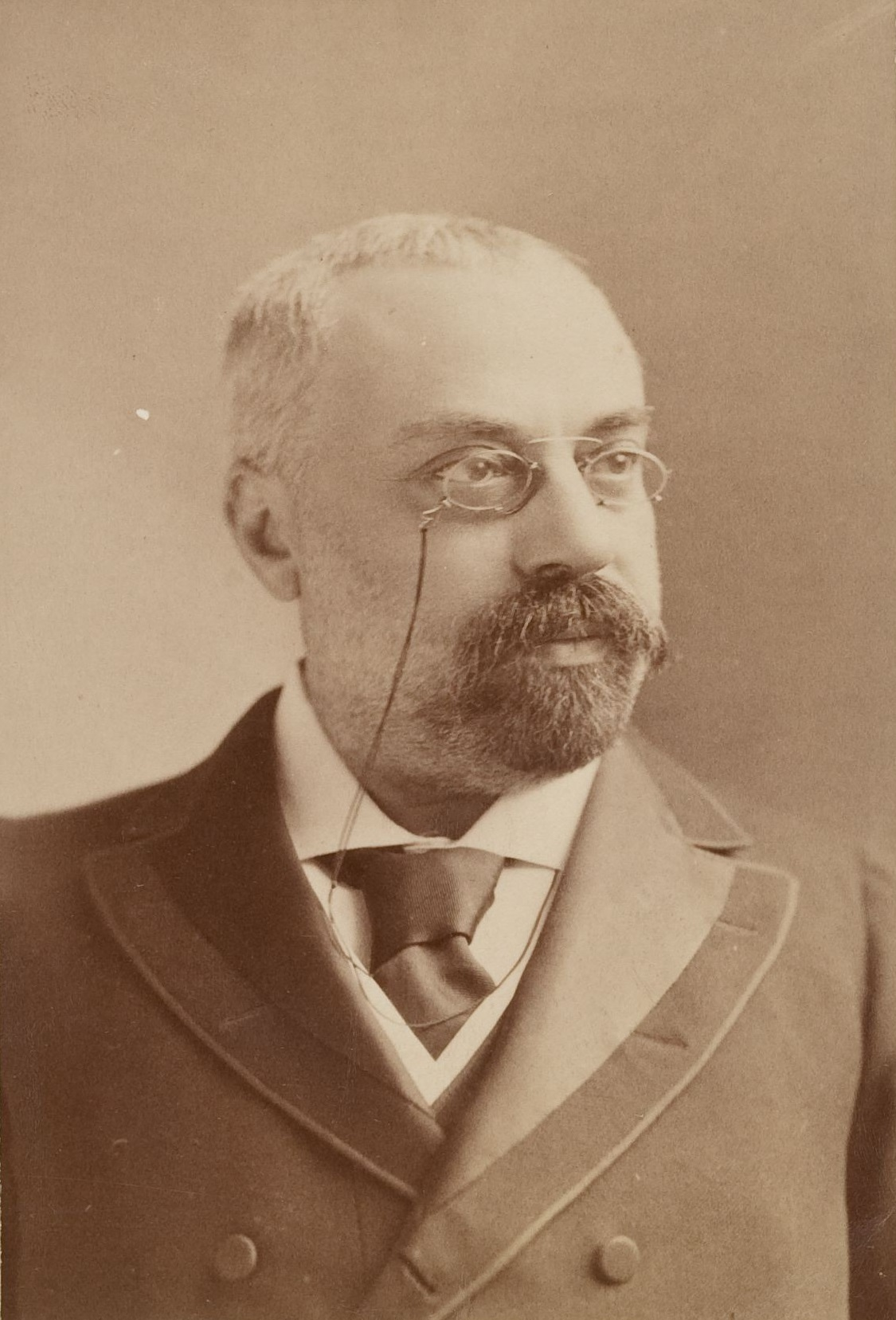
Enrico Bevignani, circa 1894

Enrico Modesto Bevignani (29 September 1841 – 29 August 1903) was an Italian conductor, harpsichordist, composer, and impresario. He studied in his native city with Giuseppe Albanese, Salvatore Lavigna, Giuseppe Lillo and Giuseppe Staffa. Although his opera Caterina Blum was a critical success at its premiere at the Teatro di San Carlo in 1862, he never wrote another stage work and only produced a few chamber works and piano pieces.

In 1864 Bevignani moved to London to become principal harpsichordist at Her Majesty's Theatre where he also occasionally served as conductor. In 1871 he was appointed chief conductor at the Royal Opera House in London, a position he held through 1878. He was also active as a conductor at La Fenice during the 1870s.

From 1874 to 1881 he worked extensively as a conductor at the Mariinsky Theatre in Saint Petersburg and the Bolshoi Theatre in Moscow. At the latter theatre he notably conducted the world premiere of Pyotr Ilyich Tchaikovsky's Eugene Onegin in 1879. In 1883 he was awarded the Cross of the Order of Saint Stanislaus by Alexander III. That same year he joined the conducting staff of the Metropolitan Opera in New York City where he conducted a total of 411 performances until his retirement due to heart problems in 1900. He was also active as a guest conductor at the Berlin State Opera and the Vienna State Opera during the 1890s.

He lived in retirement in Naples where he died in 1903.

== Sources ==
- Andrea Sessa, Il melodramma italiano 1861-1900. Dizionario bio-bibliografico dei compositori, Florence, Leo S. Olschki Editore, 2003, p. 48
