= Ernesto Viceconte =

Italian composer

Ernesto Viceconte (2 January 1836 - 1877) was an Italian composer. Born in Naples, Viceconte was a child prodigy and was admitted to the Naples Conservatory at the age of 8. He composed 5 operas; three of which premiered at the Teatro di San Carlo: Evelina (1856), Luisa Strozzi (1862), and Selvaggia (1872). The latter work was his most successful composition. His compositional output also includes one symphony and some vocal works and sacred music.
