= Gottardo Aldighieri =

Italian opera singer

- Born: 6 January 1824
- Died: 11 May 1906 (aged 82)
- Occupation: Italian operatic baritone

Gottardo Aldighieri (6 January 1824 – 11 May 1906) was an Italian operatic baritone who had a major opera career in Italy from 1858 to 1885. He possessed a powerful and beautiful voice and appeared on the stages of most of Italy's great opera houses. He sang a broad repertoire which encompassed works by Italian, French, and German composers. His vocal range was wide, which enabled him to tackle some tenor roles during his career, although he mostly stayed within the baritone repertory. He wrote the lyrics to composer Luigi Arditi famous waltz song, "Il bacio". He was married to the soprano Maria Spezia-Aldighieri, who also had an important opera career in Italy. He is the great-grandfather of singer George Aaron.

== Life and career ==
Born in Lazise, Aldighieri studied with Domenico Foroni in Verona and Francesco Lamperti in Milan. He made his professional opera debut in 1858 at the Teatro Nuovo di Novara as Germont in Giuseppe Verdi's La traviata. He spent the next two years performing in primarily minor Italian theatres. In 1861 he made his debut at La Scala in the title role of Verdi's Nabucco opposite his wife as Abigaille.

Aldighieri was committed to the Teatro di San Carlo in 1862 where he notably performed in the world premieres of Ernesto Viceconte's Luisa Strozzi, Vincenzo Moscuzza's Don Carlo (title role), and Enrico Bevignani's Caterina Blum. He also performed roles in the house premieres of Giacomo Meyerbeer's Les Huguenots (Comte de Nevers), Verdi's Un ballo in maschera (Renato), and Daniel Auber's La muette de Portici. He appeared as a guest artist with major opera houses throughout Italy during the 1860s. He returned to the Teatro di San Carlo in 1869 to perform the role of Raoul in the world premiere of Gaetano Donizetti's Gabriella di Vergy.

Aldighieri continued to be active at major Italian theatres during the 1870s. He performed at the Teatro Comunale di Bologna in 1872 as Faraone in Gioachino Rossini's Mosè in Egitto and Wolfram in the Italian premiere of Richard Wagner's Tannhäuser. That same year he returned to the Teatro di San Carlo to sing roles in the world premieres of Errico Petrella's Manfredo (Hermann) and Viceconte's Selvaggia. In 1873 he returned to Bologna to perform the title role in Rossini's William Tell and create the role of Antonio in Ciro Pinsuti's Il mercante di Venezia. He was also heard that year in the world premiere of Giuseppe Libani's Il Conte Verde at the Teatro Apollo in Rome. He returned to the Apollo in 1874 to portray the title role in Wolfgang Amadeus Mozart's Don Giovanni.

In 1875-1876 Aldighieri was committed to La Scala in Milan where he was heard in several Verdi operas, including the roles of Germont, Renato, and Montfort (I vespri siciliani). He also sang the role of Barnaba in the world premiere of Amilcare Ponchielli's La Gioconda. He appeared as a guest artist at the Teatro Costanzi in Rome in 1875 as Amonasro in Aida. He returned to the Teatro di San Carlo in 1879 to portray Yermolov in Meyerbeer's L'étoile du nord, and again in 1880 in Meyerbeer's Dinorah. He sang the role of Figaro in The Barber of Seville at the Teatro Regio di Turino in 1880 and in 1881 returned to Bologna to create the role of Ercole in the world premiere of Stefano Gobatti's Cordelia. He appeared at La Scala again in 1881–82 as Rossini's William Tell and in the premieres of Antonio Smareglia's Bianca de Cervia and Giulio Litta's Il violino di Cremona. His last stage appearance was at La Scala in 1885 as Alfonso in Donizetti's La favorita. He died in Verona in 1906.
