= Luigi Arditi =

Italian composer

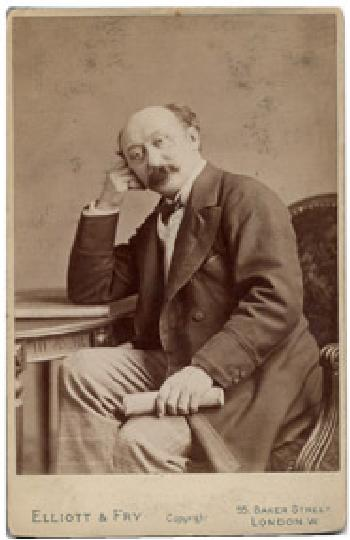
Luigi Arditi

Il bacio
sung by Adelina Patti in 1906

Se saran rose
recorded by Nellie Melba in 1910

Se saran rose
recorded by Nellie Melba in 1907

Luigi Arditi (16 July 1822 – 1 May 1903) was an Italian violinist, composer and conductor whose career took him around Europe and the Americas, finally settling in London.

== Life ==
Arditi was born in Crescentino, Piemonte, Kingdom of Sardinia. He began his musical career as a violinist, and studied music at the Milan Conservatory under Bernardo Ferrara (violin) and Nicola Vaccai (composition).

He made his debut in 1843 as a director at Vercelli, and it was there that he was made an honorary member of the Philharmonic Academy. Arditi conducted opera throughout Italy and in 1846 travelled to Havana, Cuba to co-direct the opera orchestra there with the double bass player Giovanni Bottesini. Their company made long tours of America, and he subsequently moved there to conduct operas in New York, Philadelphia and other cities with the Max Maretzek Italian Opera Company until 1856. Then, following a visit to Constantinople, he decided to settle in London, but made several trips again to America with the Royal Italian Opera Company. He also conducted in Germany, and in other major European cities such as St. Petersburg, Vienna and Madrid. After 1885, he was in England, conducting at Covent Garden and in various prestigious theatres and promenade concerts in London's parks. He toured with the Carl Rosa Opera Company in 1894. He introduced several major operas to London, including Iphigénie en Tauride, La forza del destino and Der fliegende Holländer.

Arditi published his memoirs ('My Reminiscences') in 1996. He died at Hove, near Brighton (England); he is buried in Hove Cemetery.

== Works ==
Arditi's best-known operas are: I Briganti, II Corsaro, and La Spia, ("The Spy"). In addition he wrote numerous songs and vocal waltzes, the most popular of which are "Il Bacio" ("The Kiss", dedicated to Marietta Piccolomini, to a text specially written by baritone Gottardo Aldighieri), "Le Tortorelle" ("The Doves", dedicated to Etelka Gerster), "Se Saran Rose" ("Rosebuds", also titled in English "Love in Springtime", dedicated to Adelina Patti), and "Parla" ("Speak!").

His Inno Turco (1856) for Sultan Abdülmecid I set to a Turkish text was later sung in London during the state visit of Sultan Abdülaziz at Crystal Palace by a British choir of 1600 in July 1867. The world premiere recording of Inno Turco, by Turkish music historian Dr Emre Araci with the Prague Symphony Orchestra and Philharmonic Choir, was released in 2005 by the Brilliant Classics label.
