= Frank Croxton =

American singer (1877–1949)

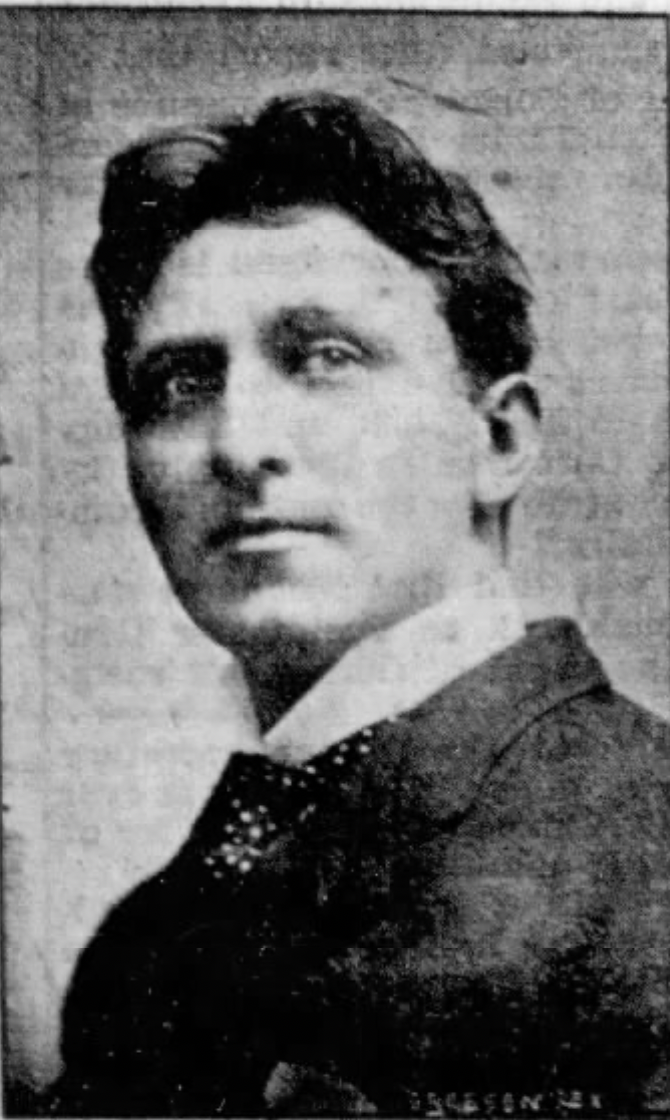
Photograph of Frank Croxton published in the Lexington Herald Leader in 1905.

Frank Croxton (October 7, 1877 – September 4, 1949) was an American bass and voice teacher. A New York City–based vocalist, he had a career as a church singer in that city and was also active on both the local and national stage as a concert singer. He is best remembered for his prolific work as a recording artist during the 1900s, 1910s, and 1920s, making a large number of records extending from the first era of sound recording, the acoustic era, into the second era, the electrical era. He performed and recorded as both a soloist and as an ensemble singer, notably working as a member of several different nationally known vocal quartets, among them the Peerless Quartet, the Stellar Quartette, and his own Croxton Quartet. He made records with the Victor Talking Machine Company, Columbia Records, Okeh Records, and Edison Records. Four hundred and forty-five of his recordings have been catalogued in the Discography of American Historical Recordings.

== Early life in Kentucky ==
Born Benjamin Franklin Croxton in Paris, Kentucky, on October 7, 1877, Frank Croxton was the son of Charles "Chester" F. Croxton and Mary Croxton (née Anderson). He had two brothers, Richard "Dick" Croxton and Charles Croxton. At the age of five he moved with his family to Lexington, Kentucky. The family's house in Lexington was located near the corner of North Broadway and Sixth Street. He was educated at Fayette County Public Schools and sang with his brother Richard in a vocal quartet at the district's commencement in 1894.

Frank's father was a talented bass, who was employed as a church singer at Christ Church Cathedral in Lexington, Kentucky, in the 1880s. His father eventually became the music director of the choir at that church, and also served in that capacity at First United Methodist Church of Lexington. He also worked as a choral director and voice teacher for the Kentucky Chautauqua Assembly, and was head of the music department of Fayette County Public Schools in Lexington.

Frank grew up listening to his father sing songs from the classic bass vocal literature, and received his initial vocal instruction from his father. The two of them sang together at the ceremony unveiling a new monument to Roger Hanson, a brigadier general in the Confederate States Army during the American Civil War, at the Lexington Cemetery in July 1895. They performed a well known Confederate funeral elegy of the Orphan Brigade by John Henry Weller (1842–1912) entitled "O Lay, Me Away With Boys in Gray".

== Formal voice training and early career ==
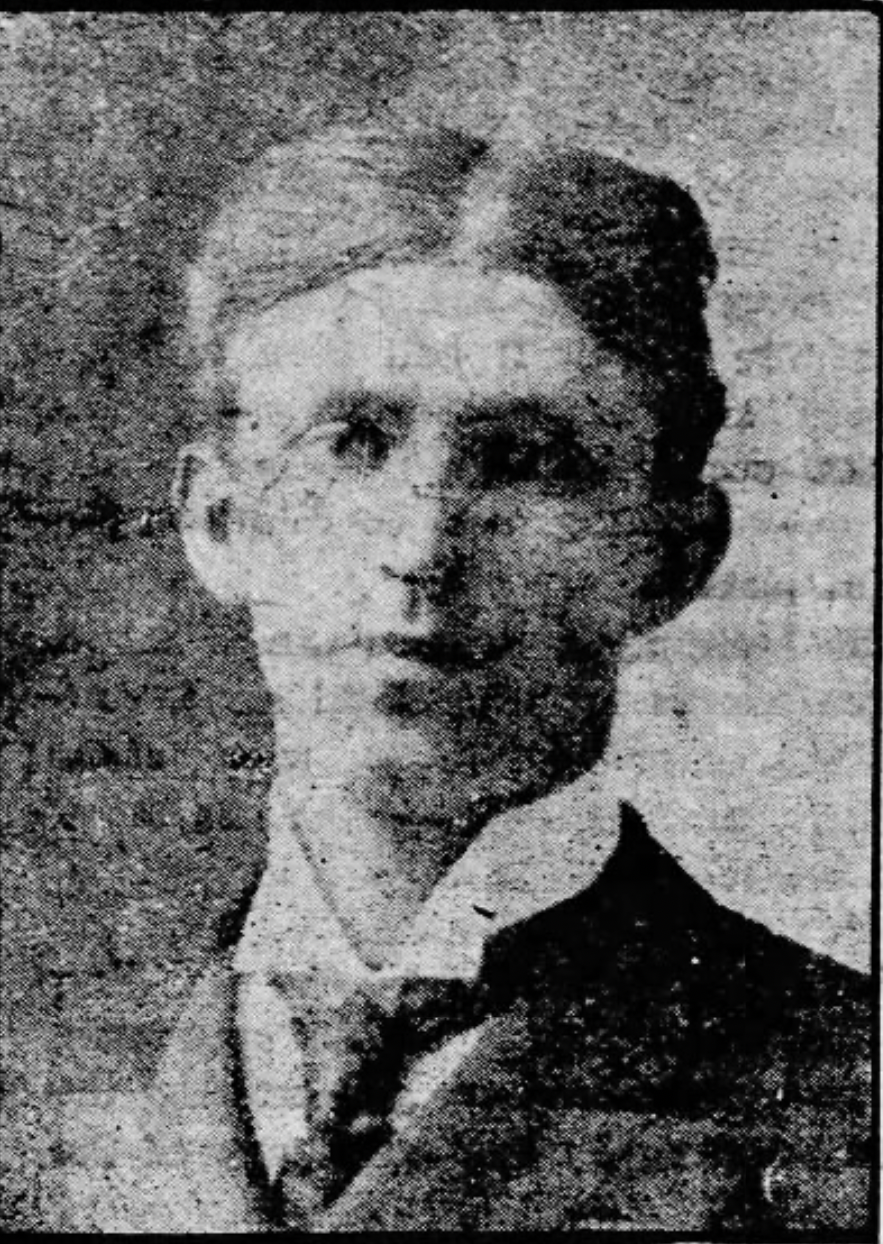
Photograph of Frank Croxton published in The Lexington Herald on March 24, 1901

Croxton briefly studied at Transylvania University in Lexington prior to pursuing training as a singer in New York. In September 1895, at the age of 18, he left Kentucky for New York City where he was engaged as a paid church singer at Calvary Baptist Church in Manhattan while simultaneously studying at the New York Vocal Institute under voice teacher Frank Herbert Tubbs. He gave a concert along with other students of that school at the Park Hill Country Club in Yonkers, New York, in December 1895. In November 1896 he took a position as a paid singer at First United Methodist Church in Mount Vernon, New York, while continuing to study with Tubbs.

On August 26, 1897, Frank Croxton married Elsie Hamilton at the home of the bride's parents in Brooksville, Kentucky. The pair had met three years previously while singing with the Kentucky Chautauqua Assembly. After the wedding the couple settled in New York City where Croxton resumed work as a church singer at St. Bartholomew's Episcopal Church in Manhattan. He continued to study singing in New York with Oscar Saenger and George Sweet, and worked as a choral singer in New York concerts conducted by Walter Damrosch and Anton Seidl. In 1898 Croxton joined the Broadway Opera Company which was headlined by soprano Camille D'Arville. With that company he performed on Broadway and toured nationally in Reginald De Koven's operetta The Highwayman. Initially a member of the chorus, he ultimately took over a lead role in the production, the part of Godfrey Beverly.

Croxton left his position at St. Bartholomew's Episcopal Church when he relocated to Indianapolis in the spring of 1899 to join the roster of singers at Fourth Presbyterian Church in Indianapolis. At the end of June 1899 he left that post to take a similar position at First Baptist Church of Indianapolis. He performed in a number of public concerts and events in Indianapolis in the summer of 1899, where his song repertoire included arias from the title roles in Felix Mendelssohn's Elijah and Richard Wagner's Tannhäuser. In October 1899 he starred as the prophet Moses in the opera Egypta at English's Opera House in Indianapolis. A pastiche, the opera used music pulled from the standard opera, oratorio, and church music repertoire but with new text written by librettist and Illinois businessman William Dodd Chenery (1845–1935).

While continuing to work as a church vocalist, Croxton founded a private studio as a voice teacher at 442 N. Pennsylvania St. in Indianapolis in March 1900. He simultaneously founded The New Oratorio Society, a community choir in Indianapolis dedicated to oratorio performance for which Croxton was conductor. The chorus's only concert under Croxton was a performance of Joseph Haydn's The Creation.

== Move to Chicago and national recognition ==
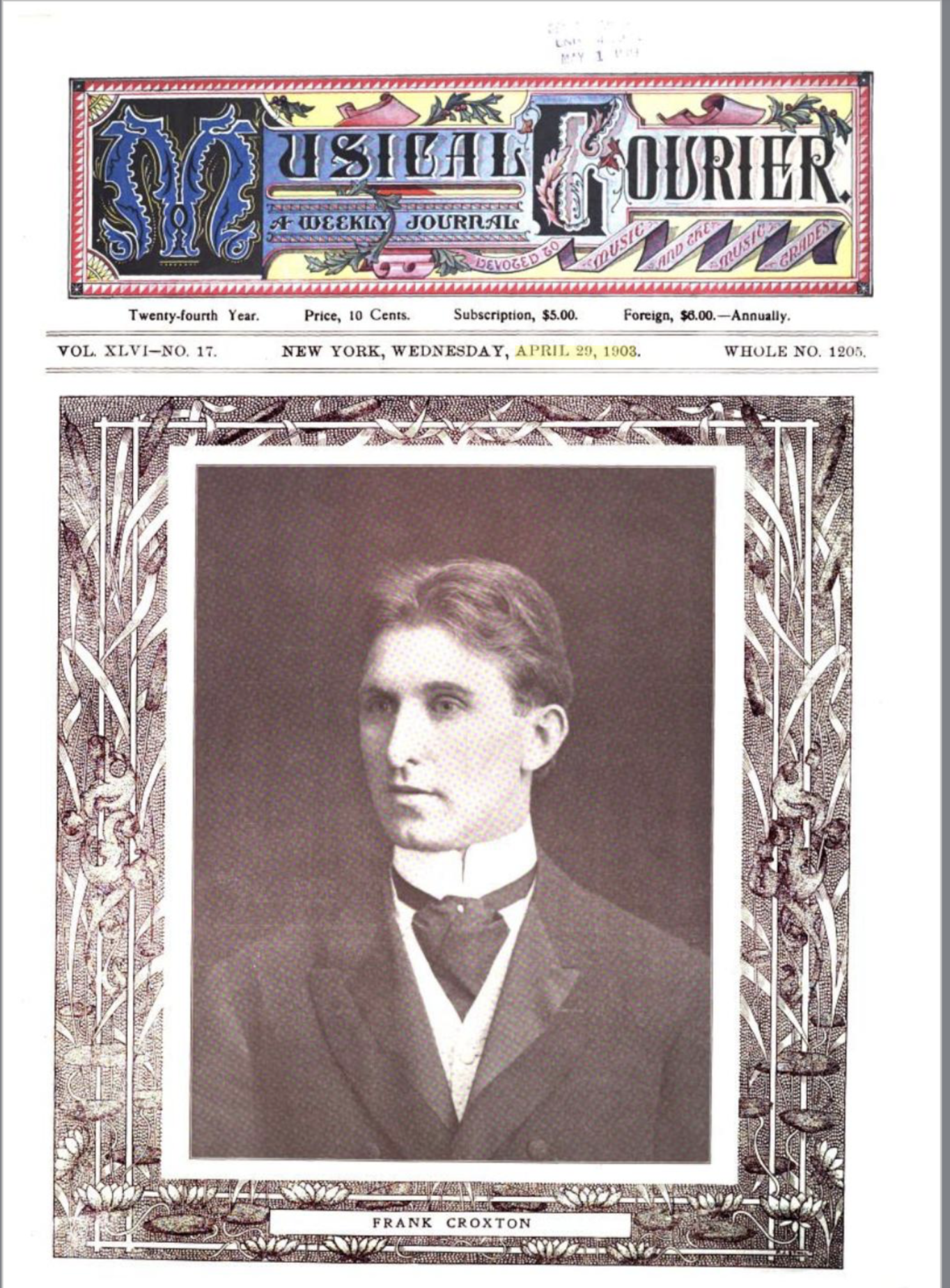
Croxton on the front cover of The Musical Courier

In June 1900 Croxton resigned from his position at First Baptist Church of Indianapolis and moved to Chicago. There he was engaged as a church vocalist at Kenwood Evangelical Church, earning one of the highest salaries for a church soloist in that city and being chosen for the post over hundreds of other applicants, some of whom were well known vocalists on the national stage. He simultaneously was a paid vocalist at KAM Isaiah Israel at their synagogue located at 33rd Street and Indiana Avenue. In February 1902 his son was born in Chicago. He portrayed Mephistopheles in Charles Gounod's Faust at the 1902 May Festival in Dubuque, Iowa.

By January 1903, Croxton joined the voice faculty of the Chicago Auditorium Conservatory of Music. That same month he gave a recital at the Auditorium Theatre. He went on a national oratorio concert tour with Theodore Thomas and his symphony orchestra that was organized by the American music publisher W. W. Norton and sponsored by the Western Passenger Association. On this tour he was the bass soloist in Haydn's The Creation at the 1903 May Festivals in Topeka, Kansas, and Kansas City, Missouri. He was also heard at the latter music festival as the bass soloist in Carl Busch's oratorio The League of the Alps. He also performed on this tour at a music festival in Sioux Falls, South Dakota, and in the role of Gounod's Mephistopheles in a concert version of the opera presented by Thomas's orchestra at the Spring Music Festival in Lincoln, Nebraska.

Croxton's performances on tour with Thomas's orchestra significantly raised his profile as a musician on the national stage, and he was pictured on the front cover The Musical Courier on April 29, 1903. That publication's article on Croxton described him as "the most prominent and most promising basso in Chicago, [who] easily ranks among the foremost in the country." In summer of 1903 he was engaged by Otis B. Thayer to star in performances of Franz von Suppé's Boccaccio and Gounod's Faust with Thayer's Lyceum Opera Company in Memphis, Tennessee. He performed arias from Frederick Grant Gleason's opera Montezuma at Kimball Hall inside the Kimball Building (now the Lewis Center at Depaul University) in a concert staged shortly after Gleason's death in February 1904. He sang the bass arias again in The Creation at the Bush Temple of Music in Chicago with the Harmonic Association under conductor Charles Edward Allum in March 1904.

In April 1904 it was announced that Croxton had accepted a high paying position as bass soloist at Madison Avenue Methodist Church in New York City. After completing his obligations in Chicago, Croxton and his wife returned to Kentucky for the summer of 1904 to visit family before taking up his new position in New York City in the autumn of 1904. When he visited his parents in Lexington in August 1904 the newspaper reported he had two young sons.

== Later life and career in New York ==
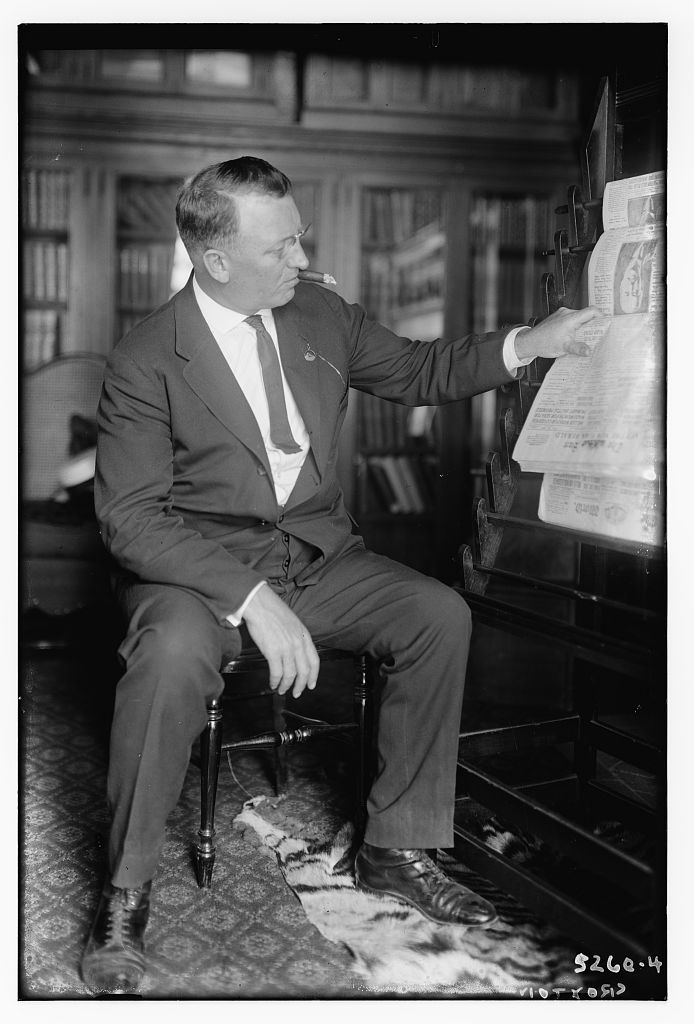
Frank Croxton in 1922

Croxton and his family returned to New York City in the fall of 1904 where he began working as a singer at the Madison Avenue Methodist Church. In December 1904 he was the bass soloist in several separate concerts of George Frideric Handel's Messiah. These included performances of that work at Symphony Hall, Boston, with the Handel and Haydn Society led by conductor Emil Mollenhauer; performances at Carnegie Hall with the Oratorio Society of New York and conductor Walter Damrosch; and performances on Christmas Day at Chase's Theater in Washington, D.C., with the Choral Society of Washington and the Washington Symphony Orchestra (founded 1902 by Reginald De Koven) under conductor Josef Kaspar.

In January 1905 Croxton's third son, Richard Frank Croxton, was born in New York City. In February 1905 Croxton was the bass soloist in Giuseppe Verdi's Requiem with the New Haven Oratorio Society. In March 1905 he performed in chamber music concerts in Brooklyn with the Kaltenborn String Quartet. In April 1905 he was a featured soloist at the Baptist Temple, Brooklyn's 10th annual music festival, sang the bass solos in Haydn's The Seasons with the Oratorio Society of Baltimore under conductor Joseph Pache, and performed a concert of music with the Deutscher Liederkranz of the City of New York with songs all using text by Friedrich Schiller, a choice made to honor the 100th anniversary of Schiller's death.

In October 1905 Croxton appeared at the ninth annual Eastern Maine Music Festival as the bass soloist in The Creation and King Henry the Fowler in Richard Wagner's Lohengrin. In the first week of December 1905 he once again performed the role of Méphistophélès in Faust, this time in a concert version with the Philharmonic Club and the Minnesota Orchestra under conductor Emil Oberhoffer. The following week he returned to Carnegie Hall as the bass soloist in Ludwig van Beethoven's Missa solemnis with the Oratorio Society of New York and conductor Walter Damrosch. He closed out the year once again performing as the bass soloist in several different productions of Messiah, including performances with the York Oratorio Society, the Newark Schubert Society, and the Apollo Chorus of Chicago at the Auditorium Theatre.

Croxton became a bass soloist employed at Brick Presbyterian Church in Manhattan. One of his fellow professional singers at that church was soprano Agnes Kimball. When Croxton formed a professional vocal quartet, the Croxton Quartet, Kimball was the soprano in the group. The quartet's other vocalists were tenor Reed Miller and his wife, contralto Nevada Van der Veer. This quartet performed in concerts both in New York City and on tour, and made several recordings for a variety of record labels in 1911 and 1912.

In 1914 Croxton was a founding member of Columbia's Stellar Quartette whose other members included John Barnes Wells, Charles Harrison, and Andrea Sarto. He established the Croxton Trio in 1918. In 1919 he became a member of the Peerless Quartet and that same recorded with the Victor Talking Machine Company as a part of "Eight Famous Victor Artists" group. He continued to perform and record with the Peerless Quartet until he left that group in 1925.

With the onset of the Great Depression, Croxton's recording career ceased. He remained active as a church singer and voice teacher. He died in New York City on September 4, 1949.

== Recordings ==
Croxton was a resident recording artist with Columbia Records from 1910 to 1915. In assessing his voice on record, musicologist Leo Riemens and music biographer Karl-Josef Kutsch in their biography on Kimball in the Großes Sängerlexikon stated that "Although most of Croxton's recordings are devoted to musically less valuable works from the field of light music, some arias from oratorios by Handel and Mendelssohn as well as songs show that he had a bass voice that could compete with many famous bassists of his era."
