= Agnes Kimball =

American soprano (1881–1918)

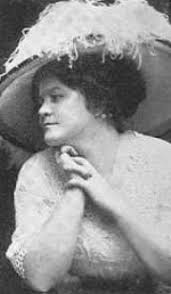
- Kimball in 1912
- Born: October 5, 1881; Princeton, Indiana, U.S.
- Died: January 5, 1918 (aged 36); Sylvania, Ohio, U.S.
- Occupation: Soprano

Agnes Kimball (October 1881 – January 5, 1918) was an American soprano. She was a highly popular recording artist in the United States during the 1910s, and is best remembered for recordings she made during the first half of that decade with the Victor Talking Machine Company, Columbia Records, and Edison Records. A classical vocalist, her repertoire encompassed opera, operetta, musical theatre, art songs, and popular ballads; all genres which were in demand among American consumers during that period in history. Many of these recordings are included in the collection of the Library of Congress, and the Discography of American Historical Recordings has catalogued her work.

In live performance, Kimball spent the majority of her career working as a paid church singer. Born in Indiana, she began her career as a professional church vocalist in the early 1900s at Tabernacle Presbyterian Church in Indianapolis. When her husband took a position with Carnegie Steel she became a paid singer at Third Presbyterian Church in Pittsburgh. By 1910 she had moved to New York City and was working as a singer at Brick Presbyterian Church where she was a highly paid vocalist for several years. While she recorded pieces from operas and musicals, she never appeared in stage productions during her career. However, she did spend two seasons touring with Victor Herbert and his light opera orchestra in concerts in 1911–1912. She also toured and recorded with the Croxton Quartet, and worked as an oratorio singer on the concert stage as a member of the Oratorio Artists Quartet. At the time of her death in 1918 she was a resident singer at St. Mark's Episcopal Church in Toledo, Ohio.

== Early life ==
Born in Princeton, Indiana, to Bayless Grigsby and Carolyn Grigsby (née Snyder), Agnes Kimball was born Agnes Grigsby in October 1881. (Note: There is a scratch out in the decade portion of the written year for Agnes Grigsby in the 1900 United States Federal Census. It makes it unclear as to whether her birth year should be 1871 or 1881. The month October is clearly written. However, her written age in the 1900 census record is given as 19 y.o., which would make the 1881 year of birth most likely correct, and the 1871 year of birth incorrect. This year is further bolstered by the record for her 1901 marriage in Indiana, U.S., Marriage Index, 1800-1941 which lists her birth year as c. 1881.) She began performing as an amateur vocalist at public events in Princeton in 1899. In March 1899 she was a founding member of the Ladies Musicale in Princeton; an organization that was both an amateur women's choir and a group which provided its members opportunities to perform in public concerts as soloists. Performances by Kimball and the group's other members were covered in the local paper, the Princeton Clarion-Leader. In December 1899 she traveled to Memphis, Tennessee, where she performed as a guest singer with two churches. She was active as an amateur soprano soloist at the Cumberland Presbyterian Church in Princeton in 1900.

== Vocal training and early career ==
While the Indiana, U.S., Marriage Index, 1800–1941 states Agnes Grigsby married Charles F. Kimball on June 12, 1901, the public wedding ceremony for the couple took place a week later on June 19, 1901. The couple settled in Indianapolis where Agnes studied singing for several years under Franz Bellinger. Bellinger was a baritone who had studied under the famous singing teacher Giovanni Battista Lamperti, and was a respected voice teacher known for teaching from a vocal pedagogy rooted in Lamperti's methods.

While studying with Bellinger, Kimball became a paid resident soprano soloist at the Tabernacle Presbyterian Church in Indianapolis, and made her professional concert debut at the Bloomington, Indiana, May Festival in 1906. She then moved with her husband to Pittsburgh where she was the resident soprano soloist at Third Presbyterian Church. Her husband worked as an auditor for Carnegie Steel. They had one daughter and divorced in 1913. Kimball was by that point a well-known singer, and the divorce was widely reported in the American press.

In 1909 Kimball was the soprano soloist in Gioachino Rossini's Stabat Mater which she performed with members of the Pittsburgh Symphony Orchestra under conductor Charles S. Cornell at the graduation ceremony for California State Normal School (now Pennsylvania Western University, California). That same year she was the soprano soloist in a concert of Joseph Haydn's The Seasons in Pittsburgh. In the summer of 1910 she gave a concert at the convention of the Indiana Music Teachers Association.

== Career in New York City and on the national concert stage ==
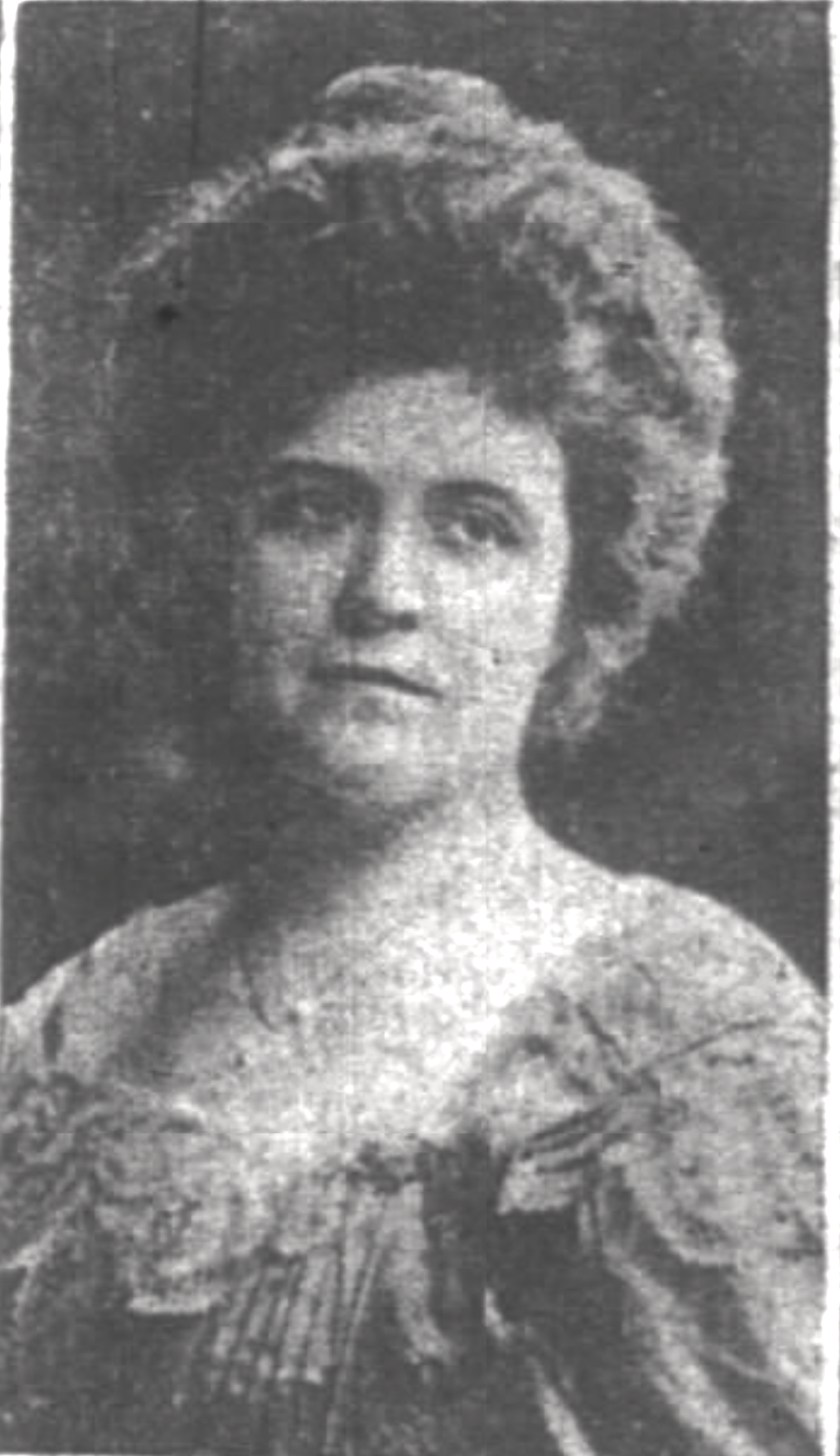
1910 photograph of Agnes Kimball published in The Indianapolis News

By March 1910 Agnes Kimball had left Pittsburgh, and moved to New York City by herself to pursue her singing career. Her daughter, Eloise, was placed into the care of Agnes's sister, Mrs. Olive G. Lewis, at this time. Kimball was hired as the resident soprano soloist at Brick Presbyterian Church, beginning her employment there on May 1, 1910. She commanded one of the highest salaries for a church vocalist in the country while she was singing at Brick Presbyterian, and was a resident singer there from 1910 to 1914. She also worked as a singer periodically at Temple Beth-El among other Jewish synagogues in Manhattan.

One of Kimball's fellow paid singers at Brick Presbyterian was bass Frank Croxton. Croxton was also the director of the Chautauqua Chorus at the Chautauqua Institution's summer concert series, and he hired Kimball to perform as a soloist with the choir in the summer of 1910. Conductor and composer Victor Herbert, who was a leading force in American operetta, attended one of the Chautauqua concerts in which Kimball was a soloist. Impressed with her singing, he offered her a position as the lead soprano in a concert tour with his professional light opera orchestra.

In 1911–1912 Kimball toured the United States singing mainly excerpts from operettas in two seasons of concerts with the Victor Light Opera Orchestra. Herbert's orchestra diverged from its normal repertoire in April 1911 when they were invited by the Raleigh Choral Society to perform with them in a concert of Felix Mendelssohn's Elijah at the Sixth Annual North Carolina Festival in April 1911. Herbert conducted and Kimball sang the role of the Widow. The Hyechka Club of Tulsa sponsored Kimball, Herbert, and the orchestra when it toured to Tulsa for performances at Tulsa's sixth annual music festival in 1912. Kimball also made several recordings with the orchestra which was billed as the Victor Light Opera Company on record.

Kimball's career was also aided by Frank Croxton when he invited her to join his vocal quartet, the Croxton Quartet. The other members of that quartet included tenor Reed Miller and his wife, contralto Nevada Van der Veer. With this group, Kimball performed in concerts both in New York City and on tour, and made several recordings for a variety of record labels in 1911–1912. In 1913–1914 she was a member of the Oratorio Artists Quartet whose other members included tenor Reed Miller, bass Frederick Wheeler, and contralto Elsie West Baker. This group was supported by the International Lyceum Association of America; an organization part of the lyceum movement in the United States who sponsored a series of concerts across the nation featuring the Oratorio Artists Quartet.

Kimball was also active as a guest artist with other organizations. In 1911 she was the soprano soloist in George Frideric Handel's Messiah with the Apollo Chorus of Chicago at the Auditorium Theatre. In 1913 she performed in a benefit concert in St. Louis that was organized and conducted by composer George Balch Nevin. In 1915 she performed at the first music festival organized in the city of Bowling Green, Ohio. That same year she gave a recital at Aeolian Hall in Indianapolis sponsored by the Aeolian Company.

== Later life in Ohio and death ==
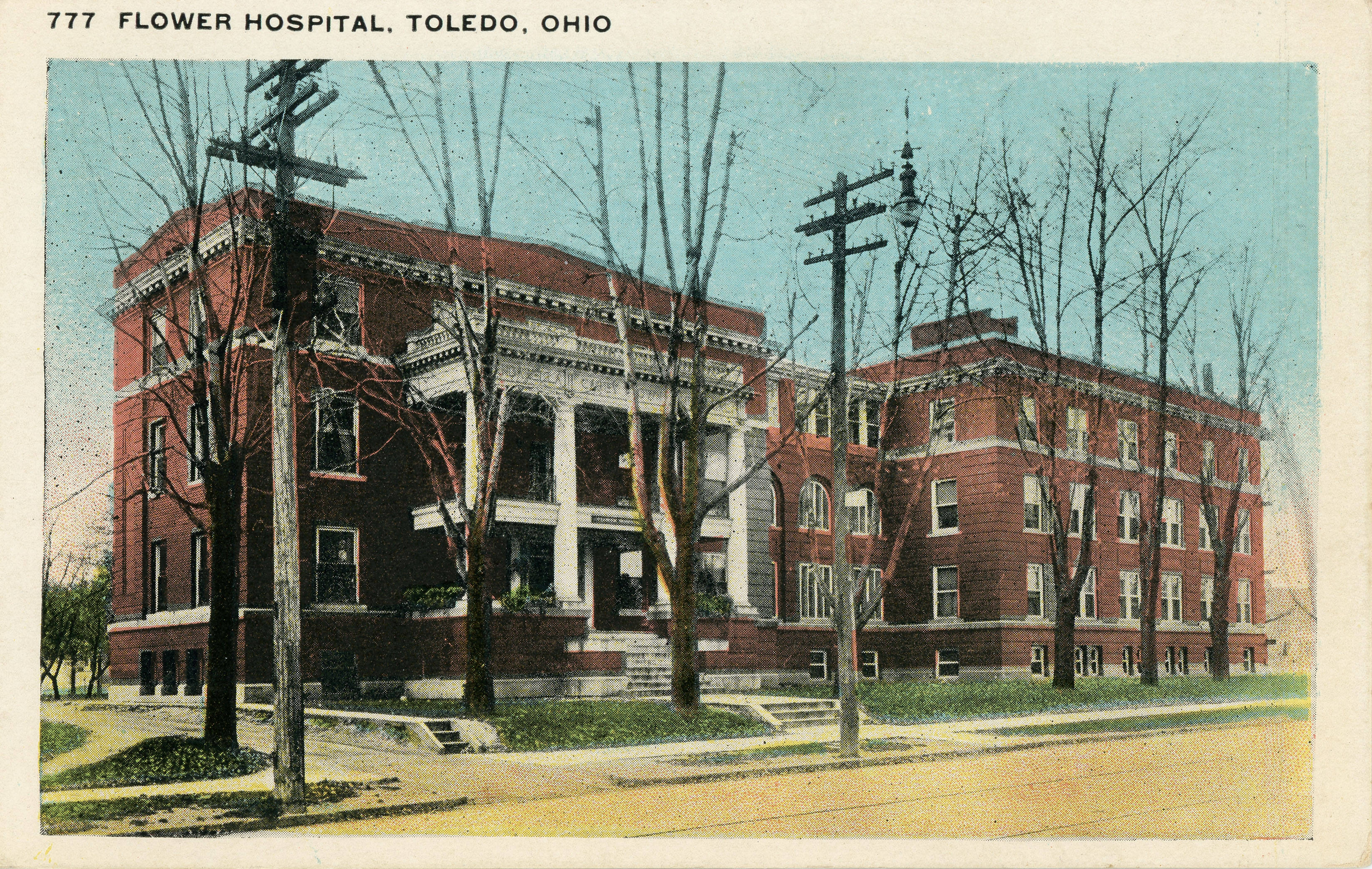
Flower Hospital in Toledo, Ohio, where Agnes Kimball died in 1918

In 1914 Kimball married a second time, this time to businessman and manufacturer Edward T. Affleck. At the time of their marriage, Affleck was vice president of Electric Autolite in Toledo, Ohio. She spent the last years of her career as a paid soprano soloist at St. Mark's Episcopal Church in Toledo.

Shortly before Christmas Day in 1917, Agnes Kimball became seriously ill and was hospitalized at Flower Hospital in Toledo, Ohio (now ProMedica Flower Hospital in Sylvania, Ohio). She died there on January 5, 1918. At the time of her death, the Detroit Free Press described her as a "singer at the forefront of church soloists" who had "sung for all the prominent record companies" and earned a "national reputation".

== Recordings ==
Agnes Kimball sings :"The Kiss" (Il bacio) by Luigi Arditi. Released in 1912 by Edison Records.

According to musicologist Leo Riemens and music biographer Karl-Josef Kutsch in their biography on Kimball in the Großes Sängerlexikon, Kimball was a very popular recording artist in the United States during the 1910s and she recorded music with wide appeal to American audiences of that period. Although she never appeared as a singing actress on the stage, her recorded repertoire encompassed music spanning from operettas and musical theatre to ballads and excerpts from operas and oratorios. She made numerous recordings for a variety of American record labels from 1910 to 1913.

With the Croxton Quartet, Kimball recorded "Te sol, te sol quest'anima" (sung in English as "Praise ye the Lord") from the third act of Giuseppe Verdi's Attila (1910, Edison Records); "Gypsy love song" from Victor Herbert's The Fortune Teller (1911, Edison Records); and "Medley of Christmas carols" (1911, Columbia Records). With the Victor Light Opera Company (VLOC) she made several records in 1911 for the Victor Talking Machine Company (VTMC). The first of these was "Gems from Florodora" which consisted of selections from the opera of that name by Leslie Stuart; among them the famous double sextet, "Tell me pretty maiden". This was followed by similar records of operetta selections: "Gems from The Sultan of Sulu" by composer Alfred George Wathall; "Gems from Rob Roy" by composer Reginald de Koven; and "Gems from A Runaway Girl" with music by composers Ivan Caryll and Lionel Monckton.

Kimball was a member of the VTMC's "Victor Opera Quartet" with whom she recorded several solo arias as well as works for multiple singers. These included the arias "Un bel dì, vedremo" (sung in English as "Some day he'll come") from Giacomo Puccini's Madama Butterfly (1911), and "Spring Song" from Herbert and Joseph Redding's Natoma (1912); and the quartet "Bella figlia dell'amore" from Act III of Verdi's Rigoletto. For Victor she also recorded the aria "Hear ye, Israel" from Mendelssohn's Elijah in 1911, and in 1912 the art songs "Far off I hear a lover's flute" from Charles Wakefield Cadman's song cycle Four American Indian Songs, Op. 45.; "Die Loreley" by Franz Liszt; and "O komm mit mir in die Frühlings-nacht" (sung in English as "O come with me in the Summer night") by Frank Van der Stucken.

For Columbia Records, Kimball recorded the song "Adele" from the musical of that name by Jean Briquet and Adolf Philipp in 1913. She recorded several more songs that year with Columbia, including "Love is a story that's old" from Victor Herbert's operetta The Madcap Duchess; the duet "You're here and I'm here" from Jerome Kern's musical The Laughing Husband (sung with tenor Charles W. Harrison); and the duet "Come on over here" from the Leo Fall and Harry B. Smith musical The Doll Girl (also sung with Harrison).

In reviewing Kimball's singing on her recordings of "Hear ye, Israel" and "Far off I hear a lover's flute", Riemens & Kutsch stated that Kimball "showed a beautifully controlled and technically excellent soprano voice."

== Notes and references ==
=== Bibliography ===
- Andrews, H. Frank (1986). The Edison Phonograph: The British Connection. City of London Phonograph and Gramophone Society. ISBN 9780900883514.
- Bolig, John Richard (2006). The Victor Discography: Green, Blue, and Purple Labels (1910-1926). Mainspring Press. ISBN 9780977273522.
- Douglas, Clarence B. (1921). The History of Tulsa, Oklahoma, Volume 1. S. J. Clarke Publishing Company.
- Flury, Roger (2012). Giacomo Puccini: A Discography. Scarecrow Press. ISBN 9780810883291.
- Hoffmann, Frank; Cooper, B Lee; Gracyk, Tim (2012). Popular American Recording Pioneers: 1895-1925. Taylor & Francis. ISBN 9781136592294.
- Koenigsberg, Allen (1987). Edison Cylinder Records, 1889-1912: With an Illustrated History of the Phonograph. APM Press. ISBN 9780937612071.
- Kutsch, K. J.; Riemens, Leo (2003). "Kimball, Agnes". In Rost, Hansjörg (ed.). Großes Sängerlexikon (in German). Vol. Kainz–Menkes. K. G. Saur Verlag. ISBN 978-3-598-44088-5.
- Rust, Brian; Debus, Allen G. (1973). The Complete Entertainment Discography, from the Mid-1890s to 1942. Arlington House Publishers. ISBN 9780870001505.
