= Mattia Battistini =

Italian operatic baritone (1856–1928)

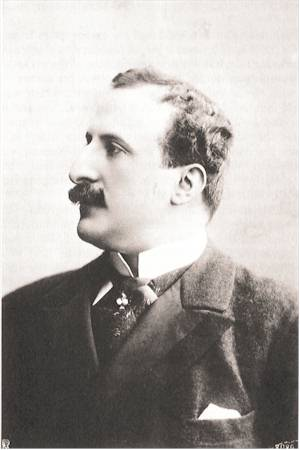
Battistini in the 1910s

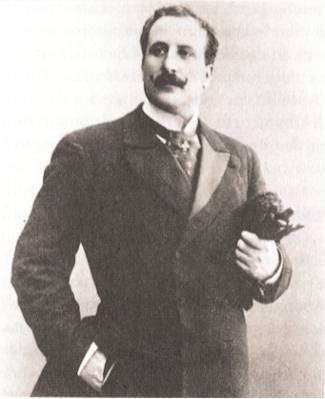
Battistini in the 1910s

Mattia Battistini (27 February 1856 – 7 November 1928) was an Italian operatic baritone, referred to as the "King of Baritones" in multiple publications.

== Early life ==
Battistini was born in Rome on 27 February 1856. He spent most of his childhood in the Collebaccaro di Contigliano village, near Rieti, where his parents owned an estate.

His grandfather Giovanni and uncle Raffaele were personal physicians to the Pope, and his father, Cavaliere Luigi Battistini, was a professor of anatomy at the University of Rome. Battistini attended the Collegio Bandinelli and later the Istituto dell' Apollinare.

Battistini dropped out of law school to study music with Emilio Terziani (who taught composition) and with Venceslao Persichini (professor of singing) at the Accademia Nazionale di Santa Cecilia—then the Liceo Musicale of Rome. Battistini worked with conductor Luigi Mancinelli and the composer Augusto Rotoli and consulted with baritone Antonio Cotogni to refine his technique.

== Early career ==
Battistini made his operatic début at the Teatro Argentina, Rome, as Alfonso in Donizetti's La favorita. The date for this has often been given as 11 December 1878, although 9 November 1878 is the correct date according to certain sources.

During the first three years of his professional career, he toured Italy, singing principal roles in such varied operas as La forza del destino, Il trovatore, Rigoletto, Il Guarany, Gli Ugonotti, Dinorah, L'Africana, I Puritani, Lucia di Lammermoor, Aïda, and Ernani. He also participated in several operatic premières. In 1881 he went to Buenos Aires for the first time, touring South America for more than 12 months. On his return trip, he appeared in Barcelona and Madrid where he sang Figaro in Rossini's comic opera Il Barbiere di Siviglia.

In 1883, he undertook his first visit to the Royal Opera House at London's Covent Garden, where he appeared as Riccardo in Vincenzo Bellini's I Puritani in a stellar cast containing Marcella Sembrich, Francesco Marconi, and Edouard de Reszke. He also sang opposite leading soprano Adelina Patti in other Covent Garden productions.

Battistini made his debut at the Teatro San Carlo in Naples in 1886. Two years later, he once more sailed to Buenos Aires to fulfill a series of singing engagements; but this proved to be his last trans-Atlantic excursion, and he never appeared again in South America. He also avoided North America despite receiving overtures from the management of the New York Metropolitan Opera. In his absence, Battistini's core repertoire was allocated to the Italian baritones Mario Ancona, Giuseppe Campanari, Antonio Scotti, and, after 1908, Pasquale Amato.

Battistini is said to have developed a permanent horror of oceanic travel due to his adverse experiences on the particularly rough 1888 voyage to Buenos Aires. 1888 was also the year of his début at La Scala, Milan. La Scala's audiences acclaimed him, and he was re-engaged for the next season.

== The Russian years ==
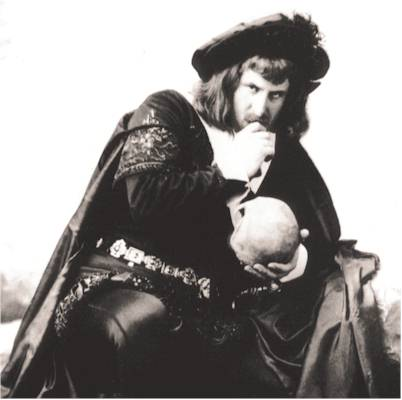
Battistini contemplates Yorick's skull as Ambroise Thomas's Hamlet. Photographed in 1911.

From 1892 onward, Battistini became a regular performer at Russia's imperial theaters, including the Mariinsky Theater in Saint Petersburg and the Bolshoi Theatre in Moscow. He appeared in Russia over the course of 23 seasons and also toured extensively in Eastern Europe, often using Warsaw as a base for his travels. Battistini traveled between cities such as Warsaw, Saint Petersburg, Moscow, and Odessa in a private railway coach, accompanied by servantsand an extensive stage wardrobe. In 1902 composer Jules Massenet agreed to adapt the role of Werther for the baritone range when Battisini performed the role in Saint Petersburg.

The industrious Battistini also appeared with some regularity in Milan, Lisbon, Barcelona, Madrid, Berlin, Vienna, Prague, Budapest, and Paris (where he sang for the first time in 1916). But his many social connections in Russia, and the favor that he enjoyed with the imperial family and the nobility, ensured that Russia—more than perhaps even Italy—became his artistic home before the outbreak of the First World War, in 1914. The war led to the destruction, by the Bolsheviks in 1917, of the Tsarist regime and the aristocratic society that had enriched touring Italian opera stars like Battistini and his tenor compatriots Francesco Tamagno, Francesco Marconi, and Angelo Masini. This history-shaping political development, coupled with Battistini's refusal to sing in the Americas, meant that his career after the war's conclusion in 1918 was confined to Western Europe.

Battistini's choice of bride had befitted his esteemed social status in Tsarist Russia and the West; he married a Spanish noblewoman, Doña Dolores de Figueroa y Solís, who was the offspring of a marquis and a cousin of Cardinal Rafael Merry del Val.

In January 1900, Battistini and a young Russian admirer, Varvara Grigorievna Kovalensky (1878–1946), had a son Petya (1900–1972). For around ten years, Battistini and Varvara corresponded and worked out details of Petya's upbringing, eventually enrolling him at the Collegio Nazareno under the name Pietro Kovalensky. Though mother and father never married (Battistini was already married and a devout Catholic) and broke off contact, they did reconcile after Varvara's husband Vladimir Mrosovsky died. By that point, Petya (now known as Peter Mrosovsky) had finished school in England and graduated from Cambridge. There he had been friends with the likes of Nabokov, to whom he introduced James Joyce's Ulysses with a first edition copy smuggled from Paris.

== Final years and death ==
Battistini formed his own company of singers following the 1914–1918 war. He toured with them and appeared frequently in concerts and recitals. He sang in England for the final time in 1924 and gave his last concert performance one year before his death. His voice was reportedly still steady, responsive, and in good overall condition.

His last singing engagement occurred in Graz, Austria, on 17 October 1927. He withdrew to his estate at Collebaccaro di Contigliano, Rieti, dying there from heart failure on 7 November 1928.

Battistini also taught voice in later years; among his pupils were the Basque baritone Celestino Sarobe and the Greek baritone Titos Xirellis.

== Recordings ==
Act III: "O sommo Carlo"

Battistini's initial sequence of records was cut in Warsaw in 1902 for the Gramophone and Typewriter Company. Between 1906 and 1924, he recorded extensively for the Gramophone Co Ltd and its associated companies. His records were issued in the US by Victor. Battistini's last recording session took place in February 1924. The earliest of his discs feature a piano accompanist but his later sung offerings were backed by a small band of orchestral musicians and, occasionally, a few choristers.

== Selected reissues ==
=== On vinyl long-playing disc ===
EMI, the original producer, issued a complete Battistini collection late in the LP era, remastered from the original 78-rpm shellac discs by audio technician Keith Hardwick.

=== On compact disc ===
- Mattia Battistini: The Complete Recordings 1898–1924, 6 CDs, Marston Records 2015 (USA).
- The Complete Recordings: Mattia Battistini, Volume 1 (1902–1911), Romophone (UK).
- Mattia Battistini: a recital of arias by Mozart, Flotow, Donizetti, Gounod, Verdi, Ambroise Thomas, Preiser—Lebendige Vergangenheit (Austria).
- Mattia Battistini: Il Re dei Baritoni, Preiser—L.V. Austria; a 2-CD edition that boasts a discerningly chosen and well-transferred cross-section of the singer's large, recorded output.
- Mattia Battistini, Volumes 1–3, Pearl (UK).
- Mattia Battistini Rarities, Volumes 1–2, Symposium (UK).

This singer is found, too, on many historical CDs devoted to vocal compilations.

== An appreciation of his recordings ==
Mattia Battistini was a singer whose recordings document his vocal technique. His recorded performances include the use of blended registers, ornamentation, portamento, and fil di voce, as well as rubato and legato effects. His career began before the emergence of verismo opera in the 1890s. Along with Pol Plançon, Mario Ancona, and Alessandro Bonci, he is associated with the bel canto style of singing.

Fortunately, the sound of Battistini's clear, high-placed, and open-throated baritone voice took well to the primitive acoustic recording process with only his very lowest notes sounding pallid. He also handled the trying conditions of the early sound 'studios', with their boxy confines and wall-mounted recording funnel, much better than did many of his contemporaries, who often felt inhibited or intimidated by their uninspiring surroundings. His singing was considered to be 'old-fashioned', even in the circa-1900 era. Consequently, his discs provide a retrospective guide to Italian singing practice of the early-to-mid-19th century (the era of Gaetano Donizetti and Vincenzo Bellini)—as well as exemplifying the "grand manner" style of vocalism for which much Romantic operatic music was written. Battistini delivers this kind of music in a virile, bold, and patrician way. He is not averse, however, to showing off his voice by prolonging top notes or embellishing the written score with a liberality that might surprise 21st-century listeners who are imbued with the modern notion that a composer's work is sacrosanct.

Perhaps Battistini's most historically illuminating recording is that of "Non mi ridestar", the Italian version of "Pourquoi me reveiller", a tenor aria from Massenet's Werther. Massenet transposed the protagonist's role downwards for baritone in a special version made especially for Battistini, harking back to an age when composers tailored their musical parts to fit the talents of one singer, and a singer of Battistini's stature could make almost any modifications seem acceptable. For those listeners sampling Battistini's discography for the first time, his touchstone recorded performances include versions of arias from Don Sebastiano, Macbeth, Don Carlos, Tannhäuser and L'Africana—plus a scintillating series of excerpts of Don Carlo's scenes from Ernani, arguably his greatest part, which he committed to wax in 1906. For an evaluation of Battistini's technique, style, and legacy on disc, see his entry in Volume One of Michael Scott's survey The Record of Singing (published by Duckworth, London, 1977, ISBN 978-0-7156-1030-5).

== Bibliography ==
Elsa Boscardini, of the Istituto Eugenio Cirese in Rieti, has published several pamphlets about Battistini, namely:

- Mattia Battistini, breve profilo storico-biografico (1980);
- L'arte di Mattia Battistini (1981);
- Mattia Battistini entusiasma le platee umbre (1993);
- Mattia Battistini, il favorito di Pietroburgo (1994);
- Mattia Battistini, interprete delle melodie di Donizetti (1998); plus
- Dolores Figueroa y Solís, la esposa de Mattia Battistini (written in Spanish and illustrated).

See also the following books:

Celletti, Rodolfo (1996): The History of Bel Canto. Oxford & London, Oxford University Press;

Celletti, Rodolfo (1964): Le grandi voci. Rome, Istituto per la collaborazione culturale;

Chuilon, Jacques (1996): Battistini Le Dernier Divo. Paris, Romillat, AND, an English-language edition of Chuilon's detailed book, translated by E. Thomas Glasow, with a new preface by Thomas Hampson, and including a CD with 19 titles, and numerous rare photos from Chuilon's private collection, namely, Chuilon, Jacques (April 2009): Mattia Battistini, King of Baritones and Baritone of Kings, Lanham, MD, USA, Scarecrow Press ;

Fracassini, G. (1914): Mattia Battistini. Milano, Barbini;

Karl Josef Kutsch and Leo Riemens, editors (2000): Großes Sängerlexikon Basel, Saur;

Lancellotti, A (1942): Le voci d' oro. Rome, Palombi;

Monaldi, G (1929): Cantanti Celebri. Rome, Tiber; and

Palmeggiani, Francesco (1977): Mattia Battistini, il re dei baritoni Milano, Stampa d' Oggi Editrice, 1949 (reprinted with discography, W.R. Moran, editor, New York, Arno Press).
