= Richard Burmeister =

German-American composer and pianist

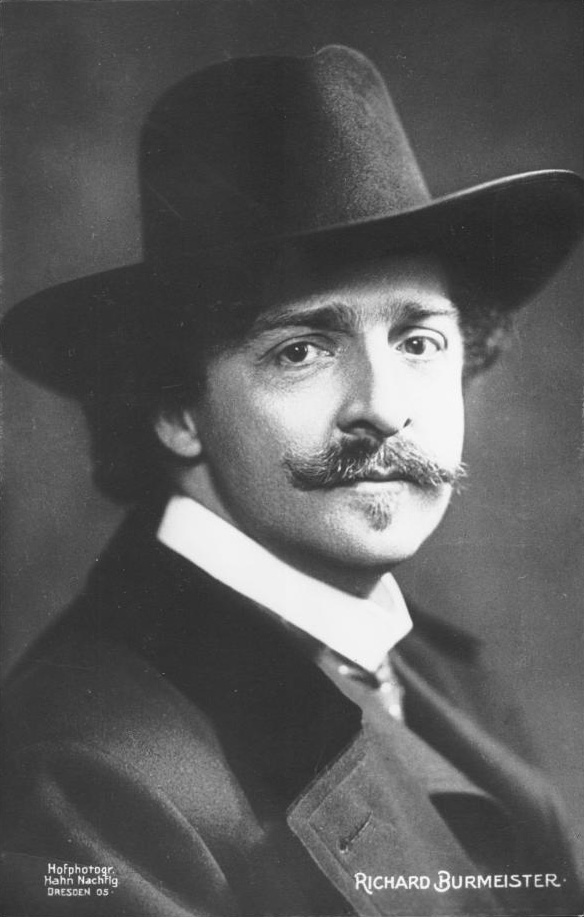
Richard Burmeister

Richard Burmeister (1860 in Free and Hanseatic City of Hamburg – 1944) was a German-American composer and pianist active in the late 19th and early 20th centuries.

== Biography ==
Burmeister studied with Franz Liszt (1881–84). He made concert tours through Europe in 1883-85, and in 1885 he married fellow Liszt pupil Dory Petersen.

From 1885 to 1897 was the head of the piano department of the Peabody Institute in Baltimore. Along with fellow composers Joseph Pache, Asger Hamerik, Fritz Finke and Otto Sutro, Burmeister played a sizeable role in the 1890s musical culture of Baltimore. From 1897 to 1899 he was director of the Scharwenka Conservatory of Music's New York City branch.

Burmeister returned to Europe and taught at the Royal Conservatory of Dresden and at the Klindworth-Scharwenka Conservatory in Berlin. He died in Berlin in 1944.

== Works ==
His compositions include a concerto in D minor for pianoforte and orchestra, a ballade for pianoforte, and “The Chase After Fortune” (described as a “symphonic fantasy”) for orchestra.

He also published several arrangements, including an arrangement for pianoforte and orchestra of Liszt's Concerto Pathétique for two pianofortes, a reorchestration of Chopin's F-minor Piano Concerto, and a piano arrangement of Bach's Prelude & Fugue in E-Flat Minor BWV 853.
