= M. J. Niedzielski =

Polish violinist and composer (1851–1925)

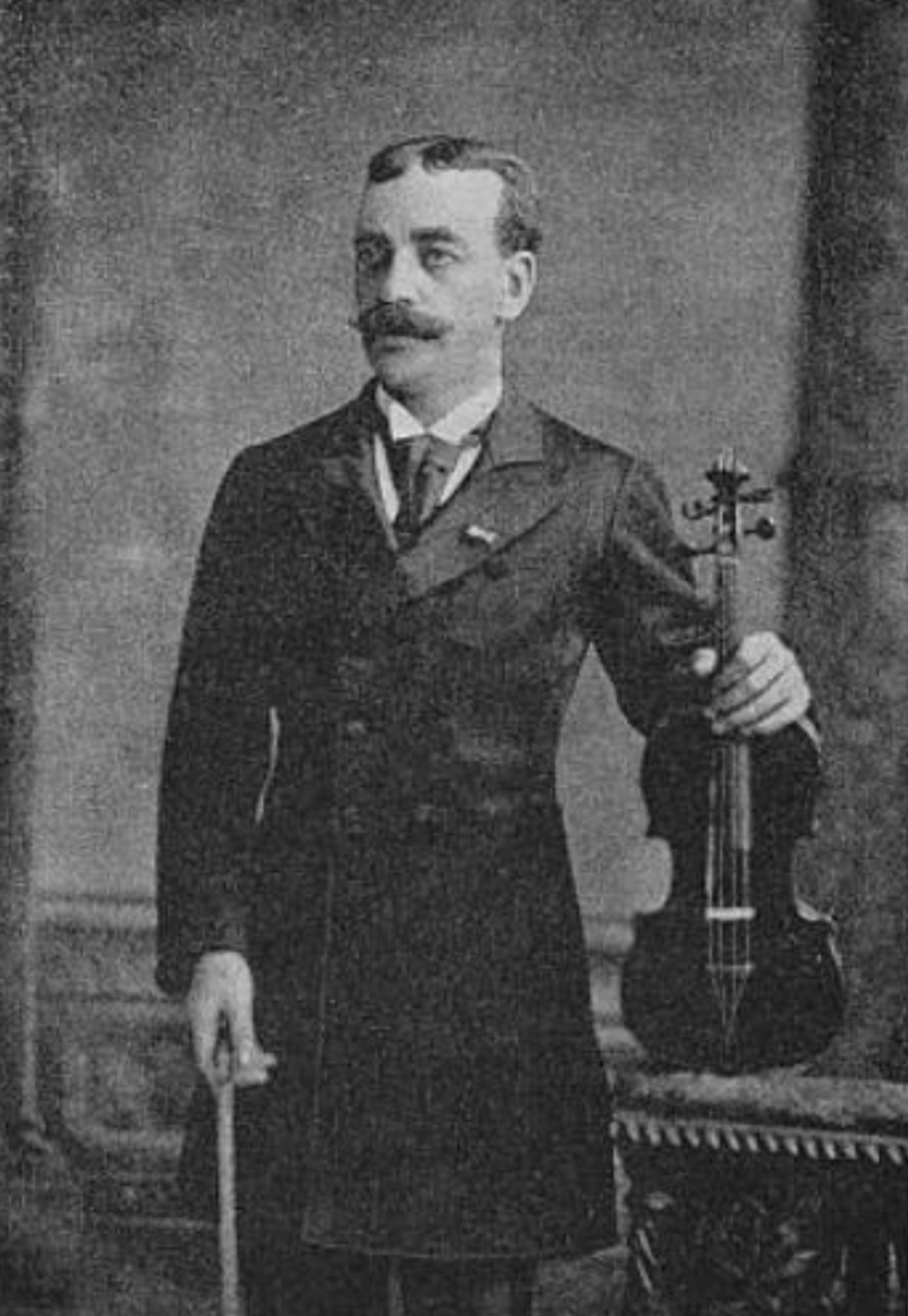

M. J. Niedzielski, also known as Jean Niedzielski, (1851 – 3 June 1925) was a Polish violinist and composer. He toured as a concert violinist throughout Europe and the United States, ultimately settling in America.

== Early life and education ==
M. J. Niedzielski was born in Warsaw, Poland in 1851. He studied violin with Lambert Massart and with Pablo de Sarasate at the Conservatoire de Paris. A child prodigy, he made his professional concert debut at the age of 7 performing with the cellist Adrien-François Servais.

== Performances in Europe ==
Niedzielski toured widely in Europe as a concert violinist. In August 1864 he made his first appearance in England at the Royal Opera House performing in a concert series organized and conducted by Alfred Mellon. That same month he performed a concert in London under conductor Enrico Bevignani. He performed in a concert at St James's Hall in March 1866, and the following May was performing in London's Beethoven Rooms with pianist William Cusins among other musicians. In June 1866 he performed in a concert at the Hanover Square Rooms organized by composer Francesco Berger and his wife, the contralto Annie Lascelles. The following month he performed in a benefit concert organized by the London gentry at Messers. Collard's Concert-room, in Grosvenor Street. Patrons included Louisa Beresford, Marchioness of Waterford, Frances Vane, Marchioness of Londonderry, and Agnes Duff, Countess Fife among other society women.

In August 1866 Niedzielski performed a concert at Birmingham Town Hall with James Stimpson as his conductor. The reviewer in the Birmingham Daily Post described him as an "imitator of Henryk Wieniawski" who "displayed tastes and talent of no mean order. His tone is light, his style playful and spirited, and his execution generally very neat and finished." After this he worked as a violinist in Paris, before briefly returning to England in October 1868 to perform in concert with Charles Baetens at St George's Hall, Bradford.

In 1874 Niedzielski was engaged as the concertmaster of an orchestra led by Edouard Audibert which performed at several venues in England, including the Royal Drill Hall, Beckett St in Derby, St George's Hall, Bradford, and the Assembly Rooms, Cheltenham. In 1875 he toured England in concerts with mezzo-soprano Stella Bonheur, soprano Madame Sinico-Campbello, and the latter's husband, baritone Enrico Campobello (real name Henry McLean Martin) for performances in Ormskirk Tunbridge Wells, Warrington, Leamington Spa, Bradford, and Bournemouth. After this he played in the first violin section of the Royal Opera House and was concertmaster of the orchestra at the Theatre Royal, Leicester.

In 1877 Niedzielski played as a solo violinist in concerts of music given by an Italian opera company led by sopranos Emma Howson and Madame Sinico, and tenor William Shakespeare. That year he performed in concerts at the Kibble Palace in Glasgow, the Exhibition Palace in Dublin, Ulster Hall in Belfast, Portland Hall in Southsea, Victoria Hall in Exeter, the Victoria Rooms, Bristol, The Great Hall in Tunbridge Wells, Kinnaird Hall in Dundee, the Greenock Municipal Buildings, the Bath Assembly Rooms, and Music Hall in Worcester, England. In October 1877 he accompanied soprano Emma Albani in a concert given in Brighton. He was still with the Italian opera company led by Howson and company in January 1878 for performances at Victoria Hall in Carlisle. In July 1879 and July 1880 he gave recitals at Steinway Hall in London.

In 1880 Niedzielski performed in concert with the Belfast Choral Association, and in performances of Rossini's Stabat Mater at the Exhibition Palace in Dublin. He then appeared as a concert violinist in Spain, and was awarded the title of Knight of the Order of Isabella the Catholic by King Alfonso XII in March 1881. By the following June he was once again back in England where he was engaged once again for concerts at Steinway Hall. In July 1881 he performed in London at the convention of the British Homeopathic Society, and the following October and November he performed in concerts with the Belfast Philharmonic Society.

In June 1882 Niedzielski performed once again at London's Steinway Hall. Later that year he was a member of the first violin section in the orchestra at the Birmingham Triennial Music Festival under Prosper Sainton as concertmaster and Michael Costa as conductor. He concluded the year touring the United Kingdom in concerts whose chief aim was raising money for the newly created Royal College of Music. One of the musicians whom he performed with on this tour was singer Frederick Bevan. In October 1883 he performed a concert at Borough Hall in Guildford, and that same year his violin composition Souvenir de Varsovie was published by the London publishing firm F. W. Chanot.

In 1884 Niedzielski appeared in concerts at the Bath Assembly Rooms. In January 1886 he performed in concerts at Prince's Hall in London.

== Later life and career in the United States ==
In November 1886 Niedzielski performed in concert with the Oratorio Society of Baltimore under conductor Fritz Finke. He gave a concert at the Lotos Club in New York City the following month. In January 1887 he performed in a concert series organized by the New York Press Club. The following December he performed with the Brooklyn Choral Society at the Brooklyn Academy of Music.

In January 1888 he performed in a concert at the Manhattan Athletic Club. In February 1888 he performed in concert with the Caecilia Society chorus of Brooklyn. The following September he performed Niccolò Paganini's variations on the Carnival of Venice" at a concert in Richmond, Virginia. In November 1888 he performed in concerts at New York's Steinway Hall organized by tenor Italo Campanini, and on Christmas Day 1888 he performed in a variety concert at Stillman Music Hall in Plainfield, New Jersey.

In 1890 Niedzielski was appointed head of violin faculty at Albert E. Ruff's Chicago College of Vocal and Instrumental Art. In March 1890 he performed in concert with Wilhelm Carl Ernst Seeboeck at Central Music Hall. His photograph was featured on the front cover of The Musical Courier on November 12, 1890. He composed several works for the violin, including nocturnes, reveries, a grand bolero de concert, and "Souvenir de Varsovie".

Niedzielski died in Manhattan at NewYork-Presbyterian Hospital on 3 June 1925.
