= They Didn't Believe Me =

Song by Jerome Kern and Herbert Reynolds

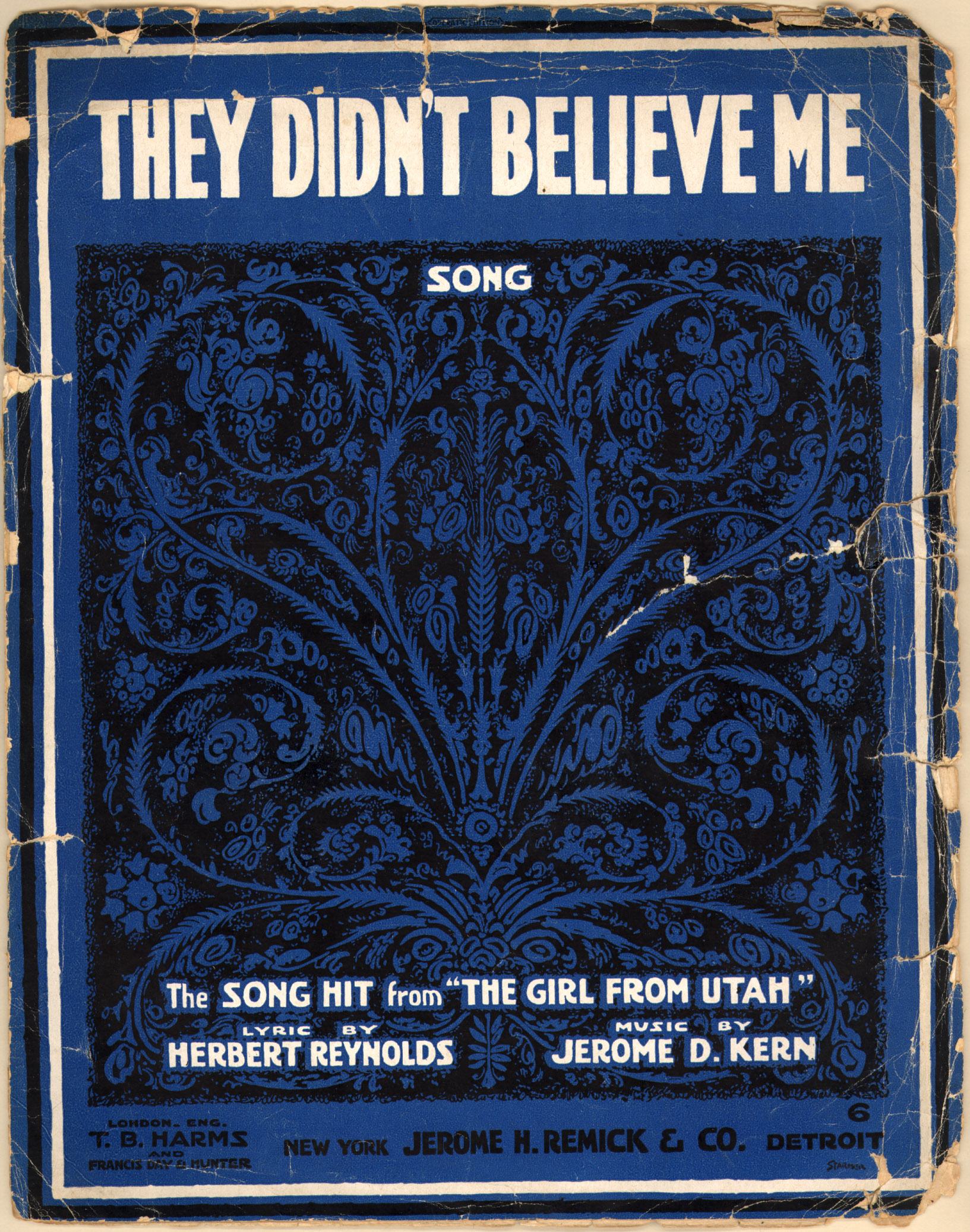
Sheet Music for the song

"They Didn't Believe Me"
1915 recording by Alice Green and Harry Macdonough

"They Didn't Believe Me" is a song with music by Jerome Kern and lyrics by Herbert Reynolds. First introduced in the 1914 musical The Girl from Utah it was one of five numbers added to the show by Kern and Reynolds for its Broadway debut at the Knickerbocker Theatre on August 14, 1914. The show had originated in Britain, but impresario Charles Frohman had felt it needed additional material to enliven its U.S. run. It became Kern's first major song success.

The song, with four beats to a bar, departed from the customary waltz-rhythms of European influence and fitted the new American passion for modern dances such as the fox-trot. Kern was also able to use elements of American styles, such as ragtime, as well as syncopation, in his lively dance tunes. The song is also remarkable in its use of 'everyday' language in a love song. Theatre historian John Kenrick writes that, until this point, the majority of love songs had relied on flowery vocabulary to express romantic sentiments. The song put Kern in great demand on Broadway and established a pattern for musical comedy love songs that lasted through the 1960s.

"They Didn't Believe Me" became a standard, featured in the 1949 MGM musical That Midnight Kiss as a duet by Mario Lanza and Kathryn Grayson. (It had been used in the movies as early as 1930, sung by Corinne Griffith in Back Pay.) Artists who have recorded it include Bing Crosby, George Sanders, Dinah Washington, Jeanette MacDonald, Johnny Mercer, Charlie Parker, Elvis Costello, Stan Kenton, Bill Frisell, Peter Stampfel, Bud Powell, Edward Woodward, Harry Belafonte, Leontyne Price and Marian McPartland.

The timing of the song's arrival at the outbreak of World War I made it one of many songs adopted by soldiers – in this case as an ironic take on the allegedly "easy" life in the trenches. It is featured in this form (retitled "We'll Never Tell Them") at the end of the 1963 musical and 1969 film adaptation of "Oh, What a Lovely War!"

== Notable recordings ==
- George Grossmith Jr. & Haidee De Rance 8 June 1915 (HMV 04129)
- Sam Ash February 1916 (Little Wonder 321)
- Grace Kerns & Reed Miller 18 March 1916 (Columbia A 1982)
- Kathryn Grayson 16 December 1947 (MGM 30210) Recorded shortly before the 1948 recording ban and not released until 1949
- Mario Lanza 23 August 1949
- Steve Rochinski – A Bird in the Hand (1999)
