= Natalie Alt =

American actress and singer

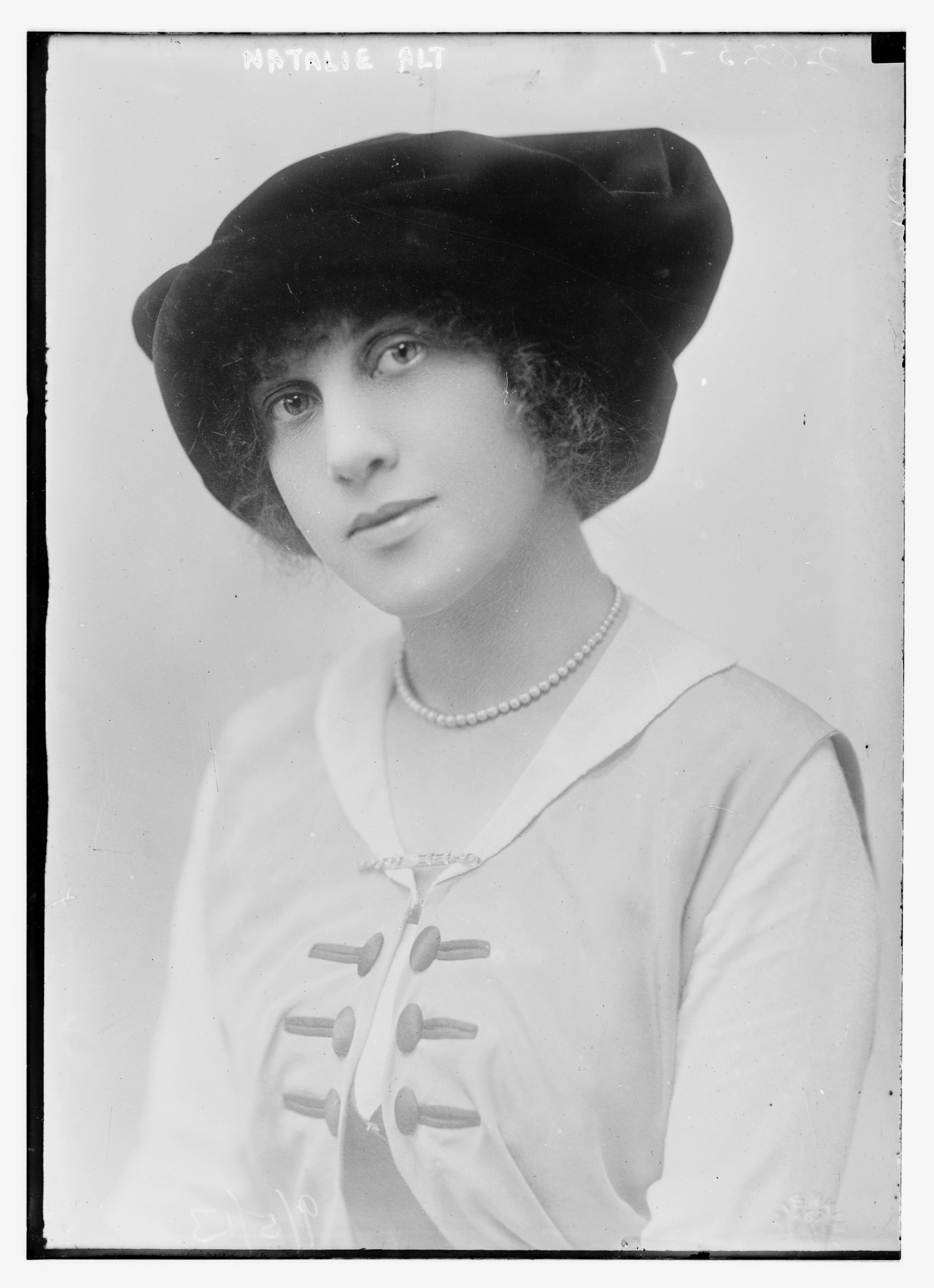
- Born: Natalie Altman; September 30, 1890; New York, New York, U.S.
- Died: August 10, 1959 (aged 68); Chicago, Illinois, U.S.
- Other name: Initially credited as Natalie Alte
- Years active: 1909-17
- Known for: Broadway actress and singer
- Notable work: The Grass Widow (1917), Come to Bohemia (1916), The Girl Who Smiles

Natalie Alt (born Natalie Altman, September 30, 1890 – August 10, 1959) was an American soprano and actress. She had an active career performing in light operas and musicals from 1909 through 1918. She starred in several productions on Broadway during the 1910s, and also toured in American regional theatre and in vaudeville. After marrying Maurice S Rosenthal in 1918, she moved to Chicago where she raised a family and worked as a radio singer.

== Early life and stage career ==
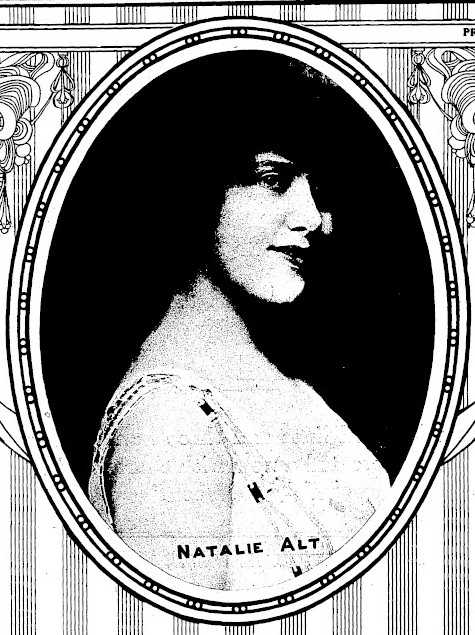
Natalie Alt, on the cover of the New York Clipper 1920

The daughter of Abraham J. Altman and Theresa C. Altman (née Hays), Natalie Altman was born in Manhattan on September 30, 1890. She was educated in schools in New York City, and became an actress against the wishes of her parents. Under the stage name Natalie Alte, she performed the role of Weather Vane and the Valentine Fairy in the touring production of Victor Herbert's Little Nemo in 1909-1910; a show which was produced by Klaw & Erlanger.

She was first billed as Natalie Alt in December 1910 when she starred in the premiere of Herbert's When Sweet Sixteen (then called Sweet Sixteen) at the Apollo Theatre in Atlantic City, New Jersey. Portraying the part of Mabel Bradford, she toured in this show to the Lyceum Theatre in Elmira, New York in late 1910, and to other American regional theaters in 1911. By February 1911 she had left that show to join the cast of Richard Carle's and Karl Hoschna's new musical Jumping Jupiter which opened at the Belasco Theatre in Washington D.C. Portraying the part of Elsie Buchanan, she made her Broadway debut in this production when the show moved to the New York Theatre where it opened on March 6, 1911.

Alt was a leading ingénue in several Broadway musical productions in the 1910s. Roles she performed in original musicals on Broadway included Ivy Tracy in The Fascinating Widow (1911), the title role in Adolf Philipp's Adele (1913-1914), Marie in The Girl Who Smiles (1915), Madeleine D'Orsay in Come to Bohemia (1916) and Denise in The Grass Widow (1917-1918). She also starred in the London Follies at Weber's Music Hall in 1911. This show was divided into multiple musical parts with Alt appearing as Valerie in The Lamb of Delft and Lieutenant Varna in The Balky Princess segments of this show.

In 1911 Alt portrayed the title role in the Broadway revival of the The Quaker Girl at the Park Theatre, and toured in this production in 1912. The show was produced by the Shubert family. In the chorus of this show was the actress and later gossip columnist Hedda Hopper whom she befriended. The two women maintained a long friendship after the end of this show with Hedda stating they still kept in tough in a 1952 publication. Other Broadway revivals she starred in included three Gilbert and Sullivan operettas co-starring De Wolf Hopper at the 48th Street Theatre in 1915: The Yeomen of the Guard (as Elsie Maynard), The Mikado (as Yum-Yum), and The Sorcerer (as Aline).

Alt also toured in vaudeville during the 1910s; including performing at the Orpheum Theatre in San Francisco in 1917.

== Later life in Chicago ==
On January 16, 1918 Natalie married Maurice S Rosenthal. After her marriage she moved to Chicago where her son Richard was born. She ceased working on the stage but continued her career as a radio singer.

She died in Chicago on August 10, 1959, and is interred in Rosehill Cemetery.
