= Fritz Finke =

19th century composer and arranger

Fritz Finke was a choral conductor, composer and arranger in the United States and Germany. Along with fellow composers Joseph Pache, Asger Hamerik, Richard Burmeister and Otto Sutro, Finke was a leading figure in the musical culture of late-1800s Baltimore.

With Sutro, Finke created the Oratorio Society of Baltimore, for which he wrote arrangements and original works, with the group comprising several hundred singers under Finke's directorship: A brief Washington Post article from 1883 explains how the group's "fourth annual concert" took place that year "at the Fifth Regiment armory, when Haydn's 'Creation' was sung, the chorus numbering over 600 voices."

According to an 1890 listing of notable American choral groups by Harper's Weekly, Finke was still considered active as the director of the group at that time.

By December 1892, Pache had moved to Baltimore, having been recruited to replace Finke after the composer returned to Germany.
