= Grace Kerns =

American singer

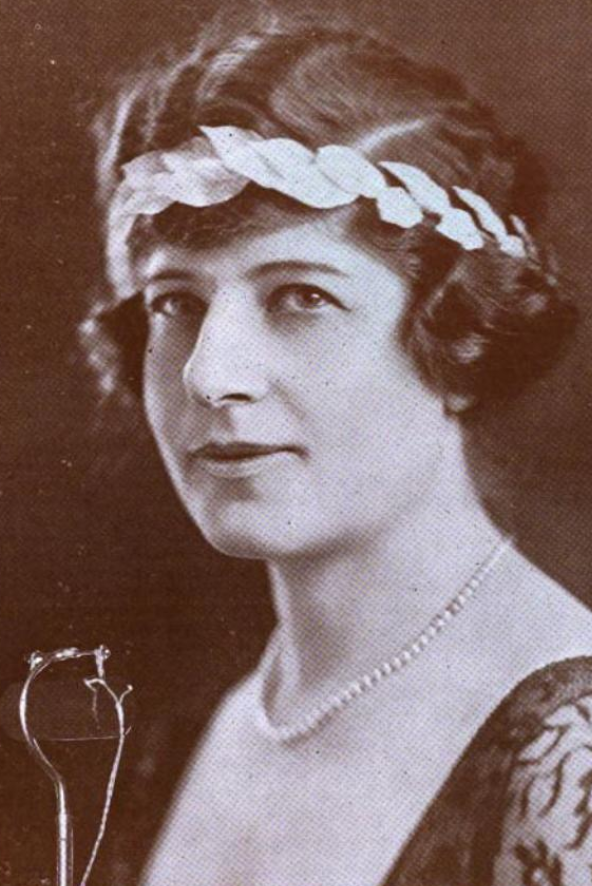
- Grace Kerns, from a 1922 publication
- Born: August 27, 1879; Norfolk, Virginia, United States
- Died: September 10, 1936 (aged 57) near Williamsburg, Virginia, United States
- Other names: Miriam Clark, Grace Nash, Katherine Clark, Catherine Clarke, Jane Clarke
- Occupation: Singer

Grace Miriam Kerns (August 27, 1879 – September 10, 1936) was an American lyric soprano, called the "Nightingale of the Trenches" for her popularity during World War I. She made over a hundred recordings during the 1910s.

== Early life ==
Kerns was born in Norfolk, Virginia, and lived in Williamsport, Pennsylvania, a daughter in the large family of Andrew Jackson Kerns and Catharine Marinda Clark Kerns. Her father was a saw manufacturer. She studied voice with Emma Cecilia Thursby. She studied in Europe in the summer of 1913.

== Career ==
Kerns began her professional singing career as a church and oratorio soloist in New York City. She made over a hundred recordings during the 1910s, for Victor, Columbia, Okeh, Empire, and Edison labels. She recorded duets with other singers including Margaret Keyes, Reed Miller, John Barnes Wells, Nevada Van der Veer, and Henry Burr. She sometimes sang under other names, including Miriam Clark and Grace Nash.

During World War I, she went to France to entertain the troops, earning the nickname "Nightingale of the Trenches." After the war, she returned to church soloist work, and giving concerts. She also sang in radio broadcasts. In her later years she taught voice at Randolph-Macon Women's College in Virginia.

== Personal life ==
Kerns, her brother, and her nephew all died in a car accident near Williamsburg, Virginia in 1936.
