= Murder of Bessie Darling =

American murder victim

Bessie C. Darling (née Warren; August 4, 1885 – October 31, 1933) was an American hotel proprietor and minor socialite from Baltimore who was brutally murdered at her hotel on Halloween night, 1933, by a State of Maryland employee.

== Biography ==
Bessie Darling was born in Maryland to John Wesley Warren, a grocer, and Fannie Fresh Warren. Darling was married to Charles Howard Whitridge Darling, with whom she had a son, Charles Howard Wesley Darling (1904–1965). They had been separated or divorced for several years prior to her death. In 1920, she was again living with her parents, the Warrens.

During Joseph Pache's term directing the Baltimore Oratorio Society, Darling worked as his secretary. In 1918, she opened the Valley View Hotel, a 12-room manor resort in Thurmont, Maryland, with Pache's financial backing.

== Murder ==
Sometime in 1926, Darling became acquainted with George F. Schultz, who worked for the Health Department of the State of Maryland. Schultz and Darling were so close that Schultz went to see her family for Christmas in 1930. In the fall of 1933, Schultz (then 62 years old) began to suspect Darling (then 48) of passing her time with other men. His suspicion was particularly directed toward Charles Wolfe, a 63-year-old widower who had just lost his wife in the previous year. To avoid his anger, Darling left Baltimore in September and stayed at the Valley View Hotel in Deerfield with her maid.

On Halloween night, 1933, Schultz took action on his suspicions. He hopped on a mail train to Thurmont which did not stop at Deerfield Station. (It was 10 minutes from the Darling residence). He then got a ride from a Clarence Lidie and insisted that Lidie take him to the Valley View Hotel, threatening Lidie with his pistol. After being informed by the maid that Darling was in her room, Schultz strode upstairs and forced open the door at which point he shot and killed Darling in the chest with the pistol. He then sent the maid to call the authorities. As she was doing so, Schultz attempted suicide by shooting himself. His attempt failed and he was captured and brought to the local hospital.

Schultz recovered from his self-inflicted gunshot wound and was tried on March 13, 1934. He was found guilty of second degree murder and was sentenced to 18 years in prison. His plea during the trial was that the murder was in self-defense, as Darling had also been armed with a pistol, but the court decided that Darling had a reason to be in possession of her weapon as he had previously threatened her life.
