= Titos Xirellis =

Greek singer and composer

Stavros Xirellis, known as Titos (Greek: Τίτος Ξηρέλλης) (27 March 1898 - 24 January 1985) was a Greek operatic baritone and composer.

Xirellis was a native of Pamfila, Lesbos; the date of his birth is uncertain. He was born into a poor family, the son of a blacksmith. Early in life he was a cantor; he also took violin lessons in Mytilene before traveling to Athens for study at the Conservatory, where his vocal instructor was Nina Foka. Other instructors there included Philoctetes Economides, for harmony, and Armand Marsik, for theory, with whom he worked from 1917 until 1919. In the latter year he began studies with George Lombianikos, with whom he stayed until 1920. Throughout this time he remained a pupil of Foka. Xirellis graduated from the Conservatory with a Gold Medal for Excellence in Solo Work and Opera in 1920. Originally intending to be a tenor, he debuted instead as a baritone in 1918 with the Kyparissis troupe. Two years later he bowed at the Greek National Opera in the title roles of Rigoletto and Der fliegende Holländer. A scholarship allowed him in 1925 to move to Milan where he undertook lessons with Giuseppe Borghi; he also studied in Berlin with Mattia Battistini from 1926 to 1928, and was offered a position at the Berlin State Opera by Bruno Walter. Acquaintances during this period included the composer Nikos Skalkottas. In 1928 and 1929 Xirellis was singing throughout Italy, seeing particular success in Genoa and singing the works of Richard Wagner and Richard Strauss, among others. From 1934 until 1936 he was on the roster of the Chicago City Opera Company, appearing in New York City during the same period as Rigoletto and Giorgio Germoont.

Returning to his homeland in 1938, Xirellis joined the faculty of the National Conservatory and once more began appearing at the Greek National Opera, where he appeared in around 25 productions from 1940 until 1946. Notably, he appeared as Scarpia opposite the Tosca of Maria Callas in 1942, the first time she essayed what was to become one of the definitive roles of her career. Xirellis admired the young soprano greatly and spent much time assisting her in crafting her portrayal of the character, to the point that his wife's suspicions were aroused as to his intentions.

A composer as well as a singer, Xirellis penned numerous vocal works during his career, as well as pieces for liturgical use. His opera Ανοιξιάτικο παραμύθι (Spring Fairy Tale) was premiered in 1975 by the Greek National Opera. He acted as lyricist for a number of other composers as well as penning the words to some of his own songs. Xirellis died in Athens, and was interred in Mytilene. A number of recordings, mainly on the Odeon label, survive. A choral festival in Mytilene Municipality bears his name.
