= Adele (musical) =

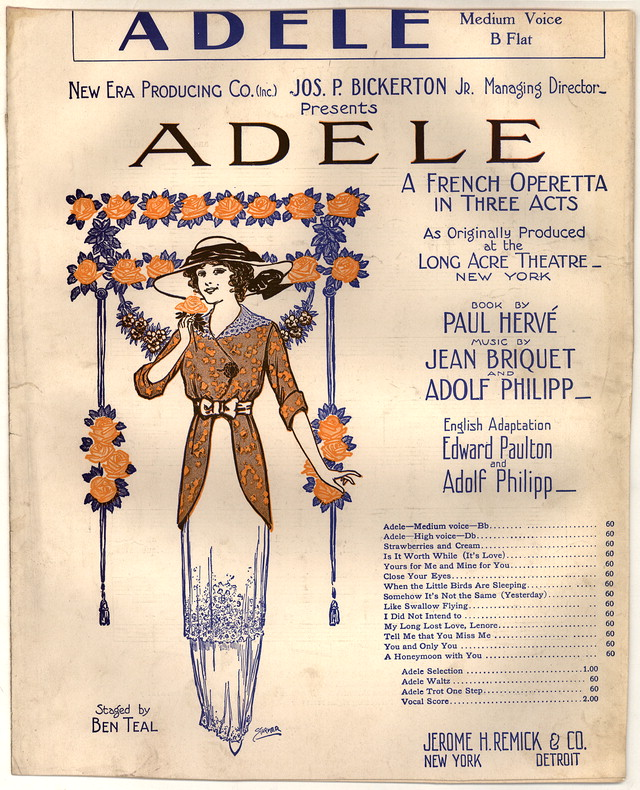
- Sheet music
- Music: Jean Briquet and Adolf Philipp
- Lyrics: Paul Hervé
- Book: Paul Hervé
- Productions: 1913 Broadway; 1914 West End

Adele is a musical in three acts with book, music and lyrics by Adolf Philipp. The musical was coyly marketed and published as an English adaptation by Adolf Philipp and Edward A. Paulton with the claim that the original French book and lyrics were by Paul Hervé, and the music by Jean Briquet. However, both Paul Hervé and Jean Briquet were pseudonyms of Adolf Philipp and the work had never been written or performed in French prior to the original English language production. This was done to make the work seem like an authentic French stage work rather than the original creation of Adolf Philipp, an American.

The musical is set in France in the cities of Paris and Trouville, Normandy. The plot concerns a French girl who falls in love with the son of her father's business rival.

== Productions ==
The Broadway production opened on August 28, 1913, at the Longacre Theatre, transferring to the Harris Theatre and ran for a total of 196 performances. It was directed by Ben Teal and produced by Joseph P. Bickerton Jr. Natalie Alt played the titular role. Georgia Caine was Mme. Myrianne de Neuville, Hal Forde was Baron Charles de Chantilly and Craufurd Kent was Robert Friebur.

The West End London production opened at the Gaiety Theatre on May 30, 1914. Adele was played by Carolyn Thompson and Neuvelle by Georgina Caine.

== Song list ==
=== Act I ===
Agnes Kimball singing "Adele" from Act I of Adele. Columbia Records, 1913.

- It's Love - Adele, Henri Parmaceau, Babiole and Jacques
- Is It Worth While? - Adele
- Adele - Adele
- Like Swallow Flying - Mme. Myrianne de Neuville and Baron Charles de Chantilly
- (A) Honeymoon with You - de Neuville and de Chantilly
- Paris! Good-Bye! - de Chantilly
- Adele - de Chantilly and Girls

=== Act II ===
- Wedding Bells - Babiole, Jacques, Bridesmaids and Ushers
- Yours for Me, and Mine for You - Adele, de Chantilly, de Neuville, Robert Friebur, Babiole, Jacques, Bridesmaids and Ushers
- Matter of Opinion - de Neuville, de Chantilly and Friebur
- Close Your Eyes - de Chantilly and Adele
- When the Little Birds Are Sleeping - Friebur and Adele
- The Clock Is Striking Ten - Adele, de Chantilly, de Neuville, Friebur, Babiole, Parmaceau, Alfred Friebur, Jacques, Bridesmaids and Ushers
- Yesterday - Adele

=== Act III ===
- You Are a Very Nice Boy - de Neuville, Friebur, Girls and Boys
- Strawberries and Cream - de Chantilly and Adele
- My Long Lost Love, Lenore - Parmaceau
- Gay Soldier Boy - Babiole, Jacques, Girls and Boys
- A Waste of Time to Plan - Adele, de Chantilly, de Neuville and Friebur
