= Asger Hamerik =

Danish composer

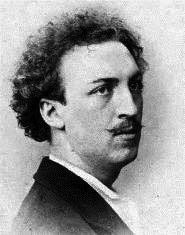
Asger Hamerik

Asger Hamerik (Hammerich) (April 8, 1843 – July 13, 1923) was a Danish composer of the late romantic period. He was aged 80 at the time of his death.

== Life and career ==
Born in Frederiksberg (near Copenhagen), he studied music with J.P.E. Hartmann and Niels Gade, being related to the former through his mother, a cousin of Emma Hartmann. He wrote his first pieces in his teens, including an unperformed symphony. His family were friends with Hans Christian Andersen, with whom Hamerik corresponded regularly.

Later, he left Denmark in 1862 to study music in Berlin, with Hans von Bülow, and Paris where he was a protégé of Hector Berlioz. In 1864 he began using the more unmistakably Danish version of his last name, rather than Hammerich, in the swell of Danish national feeling after the Danish-Prussian war.

He left Paris in 1869 for Italy, and then Vienna. In 1871 he was offered the post of director of the Peabody Institute in Baltimore, Maryland, where his influence won praise from influential visitors including Tchaikovsky and Arthur Sullivan. He composed most of his large-scale concert works for the Institute's orchestra. His students at Peabody included Eliza Woods. He left his position as director of Peabody in 1898. He returned to Denmark in 1900 with his American pianist and composer wife, born Margaret Williams, but had essentially retired. He would sit on competition boards and conduct, including his own works.

He composed 41 opus numbers, including seven symphonies, chamber music, four operas, five orchestral suites and popular orchestral music, much of it based on Scandinavian folk tunes. During his lifetime he was considered the best-known Danish composer after Gade, and one who was primarily influenced by Berlioz. His Requiem was his most successful work, and the one he considered his best.

His son Ebbe Hamerik was a conductor and celebrated composer himself, and his daughter Valdis Hamerik an opera singer. His brother was the musicologist Angul Hammerich (1848-1931), professor at Copenhagen University and founder of Copenhagen’s music instruments museum.

== Musical style ==
Hamerik was an influential teacher in the US, as the director of Peabody in Baltimore for over a quarter of a century; and his works were performed in both the United States and Europe. The most obvious influence in his music is Berlioz, particularly given Hamerik's choice of rooting his music in French influences, the French subtitles to his symphonies, and the use of an idée fixe. His music is often described as having a "Nordic" cast, and in letters he told friends that even though he was going to America he would always remain a Dane.

His opera, La Vendetta, was created in 1870 by the composer in La Scala in Milan and has a claim to be the first verismo opera in history.

His later work incorporates influences from composers such as Paul Dukas and César Franck and the more roving harmony and extended tonality, including movements in different keys and expanded use of vagrant chords. His Seventh Symphony has been compared with Mahler's works from the same period, involving hundreds of musicians in its first performance in Baltimore, which was directed by fellow von Bülow student Joseph Pache.

== Works ==
=== Orchestra ===
==== Symphonies ====
- 1860 Symphony in C minor, Op. 3 (lost)
- 1879–1880 Symphony no. 1 "Symphonie poétique" in F major, Op. 29
  1. Allegro moderato ed espressivo
  2. Allegro marcato
  3. Andante con moto
  4. Allegro giusto
- 1882–1883 Symphony no. 2 "Symphonie tragique" in C minor, Op. 32
  1. Grave – Allegro non troppo e patetico
  2. Andante penitente
  3. Allegro marcato
  4. Adagio – Allegro passionato – Allegro molto vivace
- 1883–1884 Symphony no. 3 "Symphonie lyrique" in E major, Op. 33
  1. Largo – Allegro molto vivace
  2. Allegro grazioso
  3. Andante sostenuto
  4. Allegro con spirito
- 1884–1889 Symphony no. 4 "Symphonie majestueuse" in C major, Op. 35
  1. Largo – Allegro impetuoso
  2. Adagio espressivo
  3. Allegro moderato
  4. Maestoso e solenne
- 1889–1891 Symphony no. 5 "Symphonie sérieuse" in G minor, Op. 36
  1. Largo – Allegro con fuoco
  2. Adagio non troppo
  3. Scherzo allegro
  4. Grave – Allegro
- 1897 Symphony no. 6 "Symphonie spirituelle" in G major, for string orchestra, Op. 38
  1. Allegro moderato
  2. Allegro molto vivace
  3. Andante sostenuto
  4. Allegro con spirito
- 1897 rev. 1901–1906 Symphony no. 7 "Korsymfoni", for mezzo-soprano, mixed choir, and orchestra, Op. 40
  1. Largo
  2. Andante sostenuto
  3. Grave

==== Other orchestral works ====
- 1871–1872 Northern Suite no. 1 in C major, Op. 22
- 1872 Northern Suite no. 2 in G minor, Op. 23
- 1873–1874 Northern Suite no. 3 in A minor, Op. 24
- 1875 Northern Suite no. 4 in D major, Op. 25
- 1876 Northern Suite no. 5 in A major, Op. 26
- 1879 Concert Romance in D Major for Cello and Orchestra, Op. 27
- 1879 Jewish Trilogy, Op. 19
- 1912 Variations on the Folk Song "Jeg gik mig ud en sommerdag", for string orchestra and harp, Op. 41

=== Harmony band ===
- 1867 Hymne à la paix, for large band, mixed choir, two organs, and 12 harps

=== Operas ===
Completed in	Title	Acts	Premiere	Libretto
1863–1865	Tovelille, Op. 12			
1868	Hjalmar og Ingeborg, Op. 18			Ludvig Josephson
1870	La vendetta, Op. 20	5 scenes	1870, Milan	by the composer
1871	Den rejsende, Op. 21		1871, Vienna	by the composer

=== Vocal works ===
==== Spiritual ====
- 1882 Christian trilogy, for baritone, mixed choir and organ, Op. 31
- 1886–1887 Requiem, for soloists, mixed choir, and orchestra, Op. 34 in C minor
  1. Requiem et Kyrie
  2. Dies irae
  3. Offertorium
  4. Sanctus
  5. Agnus Dei
- 1900 Ave Maria, for mezzo-soprano and organ, Op. 14

==== Profane ====
- Nocturne "Da giovine regina la luna maestosa", for mezzo-soprano and orchestra
- Ballade Roland
- Erntetanz, for women's choir (four voices) and orchestra, Op. 37

=== Chamber music ===
- 1862 Piano Quintet in C minor, Op. 6
- 1878 Concert Romance, for cello and piano (or orchestra), Op. 27

=== Organ ===
- 1905 Four Preludes, Op. 39a
