= Reed Miller =

American opera singer (1880–1923)

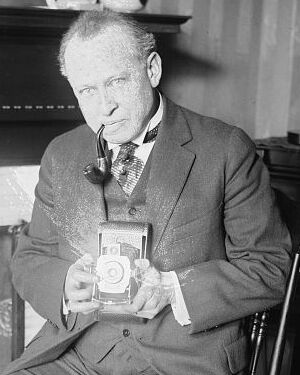
- Born: James Reed Miller; February 29, 1880; South Carolina, U.S.
- Died: December 29, 1923 (aged 43); New York, U.S.
- Other name: James Reed
- Occupation: Singer
- Spouse: Nevada Van der Veer
- Children: 1
- Miller singing "The Lost Chord" by Arthur Sullivan (1913)

James Reed Miller (February 29, 1880 – December 29, 1923), who recorded as Reed Miller and as James Reed, was an American tenor who had an active career as a concert and oratorio singer during the first quarter of the 20th century. He possessed a beautiful warm lyrical voice that was very expressive.

== Biography ==
James Reed Miller was born in South Carolina on February 29, 1880. Miller began his career as a soloist in churches in New York City where he achieved a high reputation. He began appearing at major music festivals throughout the United States in the first decade of the 20th century. He was married to contralto Nevada Van der Veer (1870-1958). Along with soprano Agnes Kimball, bass-baritone Frank Croxton, and his wife, Miller toured the United States in the Croxton Quartet. He was also a member of the Columbia Stellar Quartet.

Miller is best remembered today for his contributions to the early days of recorded music. Unlike many other recordings of his time, his are of a high musical level. His earliest known record dates to 1905 on Edison Records. He went on to make recordings through 1923 with Cameo Records Columbia Records, Edison Records (Amberola plates and cylinders), Pathé Records, Rainbow Records, Rex Records, Vocalion Records, and the Victor Talking Machine Company. He also made recordings with the Croxton Quartet for Edison and recorded several duets with Frederick Wheeler (under the names of "James Reed & James F. Harrison" ) for Victor. "River Shannon Moon" was likely his last recording, issued on the Cameo label (catalogue number 342) and recorded during the late winter/early spring of 1923.
