= Adolf Philipp =

American composer

Adolf Philipp, also known as Adolph Philipp (January 29, 1864 – July 30, 1936), was a successful Broadway composer, writer, lyricist, director, and performer. He used the pseudonyms Jean Briquet and Paul Hervé as well as his own name.

== Biography ==
Adolf Philipp was born in the Free and Hanseatic City of Hamburg. His early play, The Poor Nobleman, ran for a thousand nights in Vienna, Austria-Hungary, and was performed in major cities throughout the German Empire. He emigrated to the United States in 1889 and became an American citizen on June 2, 1898. He developed an interest in portraying German-American life. After founding the Deutsch-Amerikanisches Theater in Berlin, which enjoyed only limited success from 1904 to 1907, he cultivated a more receptive audience in New York City for his string of musical comedies and plays from 1907 to 1934, and in 1912, he opened the Adolf Philipp Theatre in Manhattan on East Fifty-Seventh Street.

Adolf Philipp's frequent business partner was his brother, Paul Philipp, a Broadway producer and father of Robert Philipp, the noted American Impressionist painter, who in his earlier years performed on stage in Europe in Adolf's productions.

== Works ==
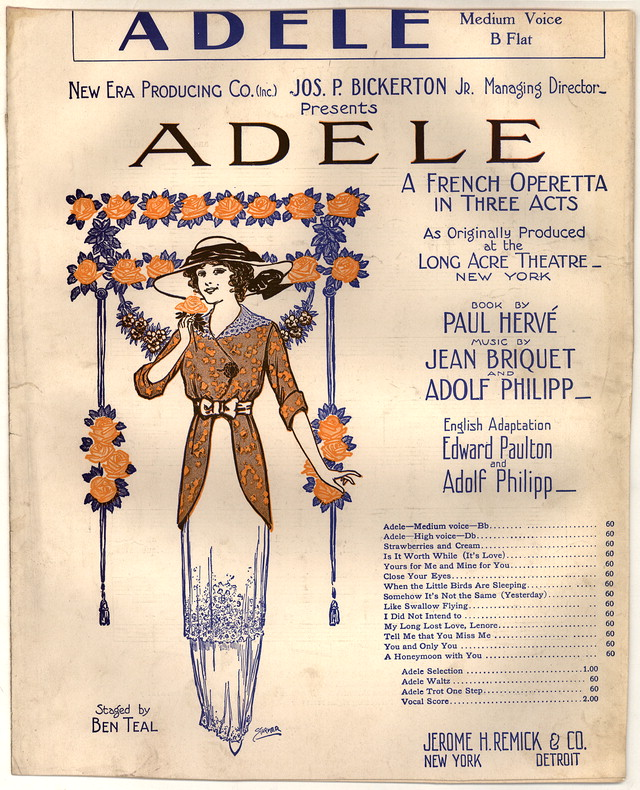
Sheet music from Adele

Broadway and other theatrical works

- From Across the Pond (1907); libretto by Adolf Philipp and Mortimer M. Theise
- Two Islands (1907); music by Louis A. Hirsch, E. Ray Goetz, Harold Orlob; libretto by Adolf Philipp and Mortimer M. Theise
- Alma, Where Do You Live?, Lyrical Comedy in 3 acts (1909); music by Jean Briquet; book and lyrics by George V. Hobart; from the French of Paul Hervé and German Alma, wo wohnst du? of Adolf Philipp
- Teresa, Be Mine, Musical Play (1910); music by Jean Briquet; lyrics by Adolf Philipp; original German book Therese sei nicht böse by Paul Hervé
- Auction Pinochle (1912); music by Jean Briquet and Adolf Philipp; book and lyrics by Adolf Philipp; original French book Une Partie de cartes by Paul Hervé
- Adele, French Operetta in 3 acts (1913); music by Jean Briquet and Adolf Philipp; book and lyrics by Edward A. Paulton and Adolf Philipp; original French libretto by Paul Hervé
- The Midnight Girl, Musical Play (1914); music by Jean Briquet and Adolf Philipp; book and lyrics by Edward A. Paulton and Adolf Philipp; original German book Das Mitternacht Mädel by Paul Hervé
- The Girl Who Smiles, Musical Play (1915); music by Jean Briquet and Adolf Philipp; book by Adolf Philipp and Edward A. Paulton; original French libretto by Paul Hervé
- Two Is Company, Musical Comedy (1915); music by Jean Briquet and Adolf Philipp; book and lyrics by Adolf Philipp and Edward A. Paulton; original French libretto by Paul Hervé
- Kissing Time (1920); based on a libretto by Adolf Philipp and Edward A. Paulton
- Kultur (1933); written by Adolf Philipp
- Hotel Alimony (1934); written by A. W. Pezet from a farce by Adolf Philipp and Max Simon

== Filmography ==
- Alma, Where Do You Live? (dir. Hal Clarendon, 1917)
- The Corner Grocer (dir. George Cowl, 1917)
