= Großes Sängerlexikon =

Biographical dictionary of opera singers

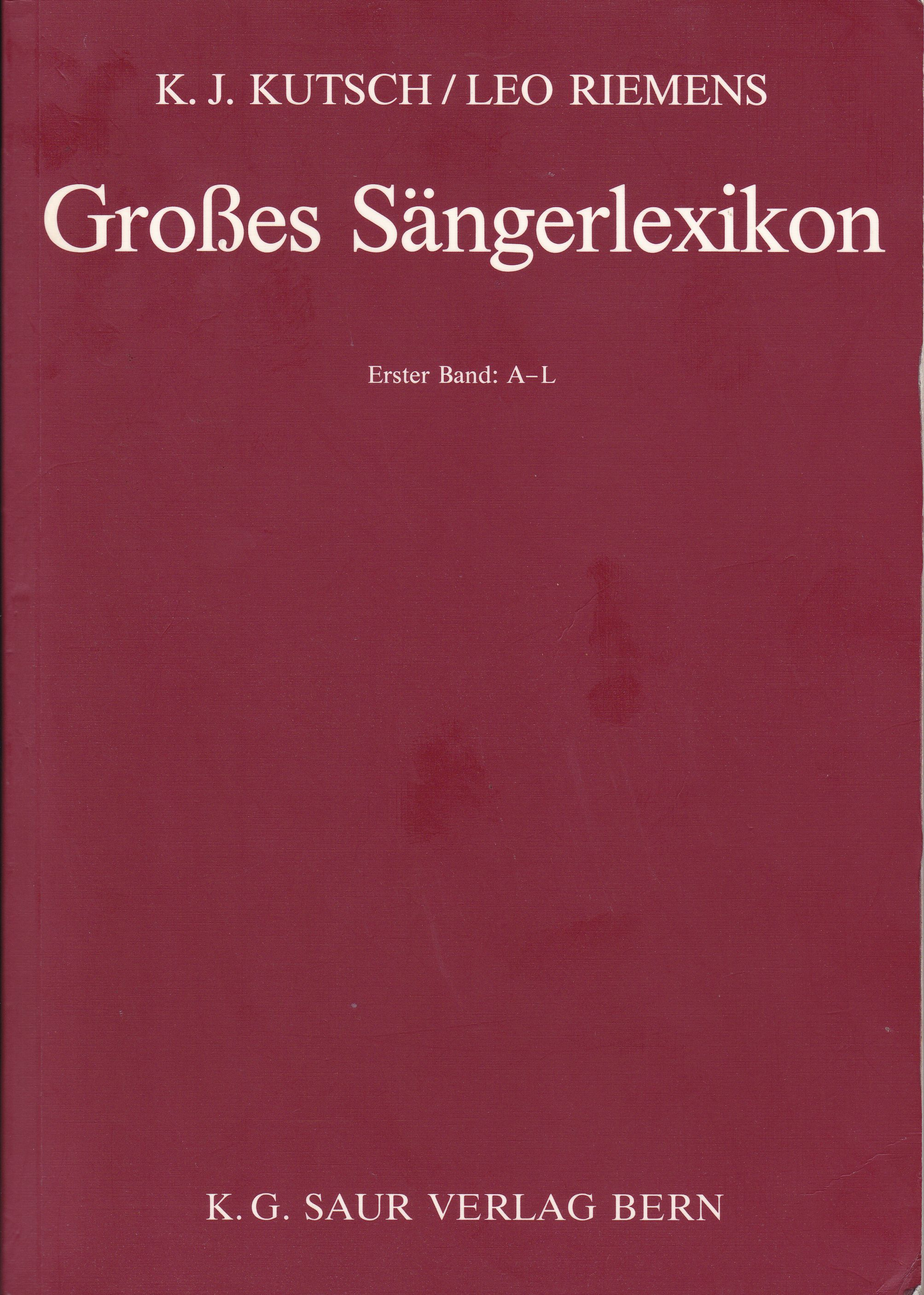
Title page of the 1993 edition

Großes Sängerlexikon (Biographical Dictionary of Singers, literally: Large singers' lexicon) is a single-field dictionary of singers in classical music, edited by Karl-Josef Kutsch and Leo Riemens and first published in 1987. The first edition was in two volumes and contained the biographies of nearly 7000 singers from the 1590s through the 1980s. It grew out of Unvergängliche Stimmen. Kleines Sängerlexikon (Immortal voices. Small singers' lexicon), published in 1962, which covered only singers who had made recordings. A 1992 review in Neue Zeitschrift für Musik described the Großes Sängerlexikon as "indispensable in the search for concise background information about those persons who are undoubtedly the most important to the performance of opera." (Note: Original German "Das insgesamt zuverlässige Nachschlagewerk ist unverzichtbar bei der Suche nach konzisen Hintergrundinformationen über jene Persönlichkeiten, die zweifellos die wichtigsten sind beim Zustandekommen von Opernaufführungen.")

The fourth edition, published in 2003, contains around 20,000 biographies of singers from the 16th century to the modern era. The articles usually list names, voice part, dates and locations of birth and death, family, education, performing locations and development of repertory. The third edition also appeared as a CD-ROM. The fourth edition comes with an e-book.

== Editions ==
Unvergängliche Stimmen. Kleines Sängerlexikon

- 1st edition. Francke, Bern and Munich 1962, 429 p.
- 2nd edition, revised and expanded. Francke, Bern and Munich 1966, 555 p.

Unvergängliche Stimmen. Sängerlexikon

- 1st edition:
  - Main volume (Hauptband). Francke, Bern and Munich 1975, ISBN 3-7720-1145-4, 731 p.
  - Supplementing volume (Ergänzungs-Band). Francke, and Munich 1979, ISBN 3-7720-1437-2, 263 p
- 2nd edition, revised and expanded. Francke, Bern and Munich 1982, ISBN 3-7720-1555-7, 782 p.

Großes Sängerlexikon

- 1st edition:
  - 2 main volumes, (A–L; M–Z). Saur, Bern 1987, ISBN 3-317-01638-8, 3452 p.
  - Supplementing volume 1. Saur, Bern 1991, ISBN 3-317-01763-5, 2002 p.
  - Supplementing volume 2. Saur, Bern 1994, ISBN 3-907820-69-X, 1598 p.
- 2nd edition, unchanged
  - Kartonierte Ausgabe. Saur, Bern 1993, ISBN 3-907820-70-3
- 3rd edition, expanded:
  - 5 main volumes (Aarden–Davis; Davislim–Hiolski; Hirata–Möves; Moffo–Seidel; Seidemann–Zysset). Saur, Bern and Munich 1997, ISBN 3-598-11598-9 (geb.) bzw. ISBN 3-598-11419-2 (kartoniert, 1999), 3980 p.
  - Volume 6, supplements. Saur, München 2000, ISBN 3-598-11418-4, 679 p.
  - CD-ROM of volumes 1–6 (= Digitale Bibliothek vol. 33). Directmedia, Berlin 2000, ISBN 3-89853-133-3. Also: Directmedia, Berlin 2004, ISBN 3-89853-433-2
  - Volume 7. supplements 2. Saur, Munich 2002, ISBN 3-598-11453-2, 634 p.
- 4th edition, expanded and updated
  - 7 volumes (Aarden–Castles; Castori–Frampoli; Franc–Kaidanoff; Kainz–Menkes; Menni–Rappold; Rasa–Sutton; Suvanny–Zysset). Print and E-Book. Saur, Munich 2003, ISBN 978-3-598-44088-5 (also De Gruyter, Berlin, ISBN 978-3-11-915958-6), LIX, 5371 p.
