= Leo Riemens =

Dutch music historian

- Born: Leonardus Antony Marinus Riemens; 3 December 1910; Zevenbergen, Netherlands
- Died: 3 April 1985 (aged 74); Maastricht, Netherlands
- Occupations: Musicologist; Journalist; Writer
- Works: Großes Sängerlexikon

Leonardus Antony Marinus Riemens (3 December 1910 – 3 April 1985) was a Dutch musicologist and cultural journalist. He wrote a book about Maria Callas, and together with Karl-Josef Kutsch began a reference book about opera singers in 1962, which grew to Großes Sängerlexikon, the standard reference in the field.

== Background and career ==
Born in Zevenbergen, Riemens grew up in a family of physicians in Amsterdam. He studied musicology in Amsterdam and worked from 1931 as a feature editor for the newspaper Het Vaderland. Later he was a member of the extreme-right NSB. During the Second World War he worked for the nazified Nederlandsche Omroep.

From 1954 to 1976 he was an opera and television critic for the newspaper De Telegraaf. Riemens published numerous articles in the professional journals Opera, Luister, Gramophone and Opera News. He wrote an opera guide and a biography about Maria Callas. At Radio Hilversum he designed the series Uren der Zangkunst. Riemens owned one of the largest record collections of his time. For the record series Lebendige Vergangenheit published by Jürgen Schmidt he wrote cover texts for almost unknown singers.

Riemens published a small vocal encyclopedia in German with Karl-Josef Kutsch in 1962 under the title Unvergängliche Stimmen: kleines Sängerlexicon [Immortal Voices: Concise Dictionary of Singers], which was expanded in 1966 and translated into English, expanded, and annotated by Harry Earl Jones and published as A Concise Biographical Dictionary of Singers in 1969. Expanded versions in German followed in 1975 (with a supplement in 1979) and in 1982 as Unvergängliche Stimmen: Sängerlexikon. After his death, this reference work was expanded into the Großes Sängerlexikon, first published in two volumes in 1987. The fourth edition of the Biographical Dictionary of Singers, in seven volumes, appeared in 2003, reissued in 2012 as an anniversary edition (Jubiläumsausgabe) with 18,760 entries. It is regarded as the standard reference in the field.

Riemens died in Maastricht and is buried with Rietje Hendriks at the Tongerseweg cemetery. The gravestone bears the inscription Pace, pace, mio dio.

== Publications ==
- Peter van der Spek (ed.): Groot operaboek. Abcoude : Uniepers, 1993
- with Karl-Josef Kutsch: Großes Sängerlexikon. Since 1962 several editions and revised editions
- Maria Callas. Utrecht: Bruna, 1960
- De opera. Bilthoven: Nelissen, 1958
- Uren der zangkunst. Opera's beroemde zangers en zangeressen. Amsterdam: De Bezige Bij, 1954
- Thomas Russell Ybarra: Caruso : een gouden stem verovert de wereld. Translation from the English by Leo Riemens. Bilthoven: Nelissen, 1955
