= Joseph Pache =

Joseph Pache (1861–1926) was a composer, teacher, and director of the Baltimore Oratorio society from 1892 to 1924 when the society disbanded.

== Move to the United States and Professional Career ==
Pache was a native of Germany and studied at the Munich Conservatory and with Max Bruch in Breslau. When a sister conservatory was founded in New York, he decided to relocate and around 1890, he started work in New York.

In 1892, Pache was contacted by Otto Sutro, the founder of the Baltimore Oratorio Society. Sutro requested that Pache work as the director for the society. The previous director, Fritz Frinke, had returned to Germany. Pache agreed to move to Baltimore not out of his love for the position, but because he enjoyed the variety and quantity of food in Lexington Market.

Pache spent 32 years directing the Baltimore Oratorio Society and to supplement also organized the Women's Philharmonic Society and the Oratorio society of York, PA. He directed the latter for 7 years, simultaneously to his work with the Baltimore Oratorio society. His Baltimore work included a late-1800s collaboration with the Danish-cum-Baltimorean composer Asger Hamerik, who (according to liner notes for Hamerik's choral symphony no. 7) "was pleased with his collaboration with [Pache], who like himself had been a pupil of [Hans] von Bülow." The choral collaboration in question involved more than 300 singers, with more than 60 rehearsals leading up to what The Baltimore Sun called a performance "of overwhelming beauty."

After the Baltimore Oratorio Society disbanded in 1924, Joseph Pache worked chiefly with the "Choir Invisible," a choir of approximately forty members in Washington D.C. He continued to teach voice and maintain studios in Baltimore, Washington, and Annapolis.

== Lawsuit of 1921 and Mr. Pache's estate ==
In November 1921, Joseph Pache was the defendant in a filed lawsuit alongside his secretary, Ms. Bessie Darling. The plaintiff, Samuel K. Hornstein, requested $15,000 for loss and injury he experienced in August from the collapse of a bridge on Pache and Darling's property. Why Mr. Pache and Ms. Darling co-owned property is unknown. Post Pache's death, Ms. Darling was placed in charge of estate sales, despite the deceased still having living relatives (including a widow) in Germany.

== Death ==
Joseph Pache died of heart disease on December 7, 1926 in Maryland General Hospital.
