= Oratorio Society of Baltimore =

The Oratorio Society of Baltimore was founded by Otto Sutro in 1882, with Fritz Finke as music director. Its first performance came in 1885.

In 1892, Finke left the Oratorio Society to return to Germany. Mr. Sutro contacted Joseph Pache, a German conservatory professor in New York, to succeed Finke as general director. Pache directed the society through its disbandment in 1924.
