= Nevada Van der Veer =

American contralto singer (1884–1958)

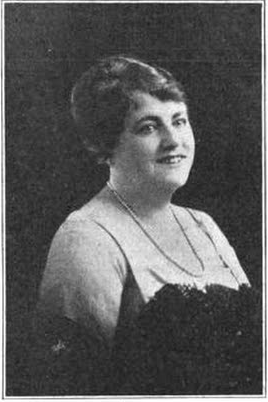
Nevada Van der Veer, from a 1921 publication.

Nevada Van der Veer Miller (July 25, 1884 – September 26, 1958) was an American contralto singer.

== Early life ==
Emma Nevada Van der Veer was born in New York, the daughter of George Wyckoff Van der Veer and Jennie Lind Catlin Van der Veer. She was named for the American opera singer Emma Nevada. She studied music in New York and Boston, with further studies in England.

== Career ==
Nevada Van der Veer was a paid contralto soloist at two New York City churches, Collegiate Church of St. Nicholas and Fifth Avenue Presbyterian Church, and at Church of the Pilgrims in Brooklyn. She maintained a busy touring and schedule in the 1920s, both before after giving her first solo recital at Aeolian Hall in 1920. Her voice was described as "powerful, but always smooth and velvety in quality, no matter how loudly she sings."

Van der Veer made several recordings between 1911 and 1925, including with the Victor Light Opera Company (the in house singing group for Victor Records); and several with her husband Reed Miller, in duet or quartet arrangements. In 1923, she sang at the grave of Susan B. Anthony, during an event organized by the National Woman's Party. When New York radio station WABC (AM) began in 1926, Van der Veer was featured in the live on-air concert that started their programming.

In 1921 and 1922, Van der Veer and her husband ran a "summer vocal school" for young singers near Lake George, New York. She was head of the voice department at the Cleveland Institute of Music, from 1934 until her retirement in 1949. She was a member of the New York Singing Teachers Association.

== Personal life ==
Nevada Van der Veer married Reed Miller, a noted tenor. She was widowed in 1923, and she died in 1958, aged 74 years, in New York.
