= Karl-Josef Kutsch =

German physician (born 1924)

- Born: 11 May 1924 (age 102); Gangelt, North Rhine-Westphalia, Germany
- Other name: K. J. Kutsch
- Education: Goethe University Frankfurt
- Occupations: Physician; Writer
- Works: Großes Sängerlexikon

Karl-Josef Kutsch, also known as K. J. Kutsch, (born 11 May 1924) is a German physician and music biographer. With the Dutch musicologist Leo Riemens he co-authored the Großes Sängerlexikon, the standard reference for opera singers.

== Life and work ==
Born in Gangelt, Kutsch studied medicine, was drafted and participated as a soldier in the Russia campaign of the Second World War. He then completed his studies at the Goethe University Frankfurt in 1948. He practised as a physician from 1952 to 1989 in his hometown, together with his wife. A street in Gangelt is named after him.

From the 1950s, Kutsch built a collection of records and singers' biographies. Together with the Dutch musicologist Leo Riemens, he published a small biographical dictionary of singers in 1962 under the title Unvergängliche Stimmen (Immortal Voices). In 1975 the work was revised as Unvergängliche Stimmen / Sängerlexikon. The Opera magazine review of this third edition noted that it was "a vast improvement over its predecessors" but then listed large numbers of errors, adding "Space considerations [...] prohibit more than mention of the innumerable mistakes and omissions... Serious collectors will have a field day sorting these out." The next revision was in 1985 with his and Riemens' cooperation and under the title Großes Sängerlexikon (Great Singers' Lexicon), it was substantially expanded with the collaboration of Hansjörg Rost and in the current edition comprises seven volumes with detailed biographies of 18,760 singers from the Renaissance to the present day. The biographies mention the subject's name, a possible stage name, the dates and place of birth and death as well as the voice category and give an overview of the career – according to places of activity and works that were sung and played. In addition, the biographies contain brief mentions of important milestones, a description of the voice, as well as bibliographical references and major recordings made if any. The fourth edition of the Biographical Dictionary of Singers, in seven volumes, was reissued in 2012 as an anniversary edition (Jubiläumsausgabe), with now 18,760 entries. It is regarded as the standard reference in the field. The information is regarded as valuable not only for opera but also for general historic and sociological studies.

== Publications ==
- Der Gesundheitszustand der Schulkinder im Kreise Geilenkirchen-Heinsberg im Schuljahr 1946–1947, University thesis 1948
- with Leo Riemens: Großes Sängerlexikon. Since 1962 this work has known several and revised editions:
  - 4th, extended and updated edition. 7 volumes (Aarden-Castles; Castori-Frampoli; Franc-Kaidanoff; Kainz-Menkes; Menni-Rappold; Rasa-Sutton; Suvanny-Zysset). Printed edition with e-book. Saur, Munich 2003, ISBN 978-3-598-44088-5 (taken over later by Walter de Gruyter, Berlin, ISBN 978-3-11-915958-6), LIX, p. 5371
